= Archduchess Elisabeth Marie of Austria =

- Princess Otto of Windisch-Graetz
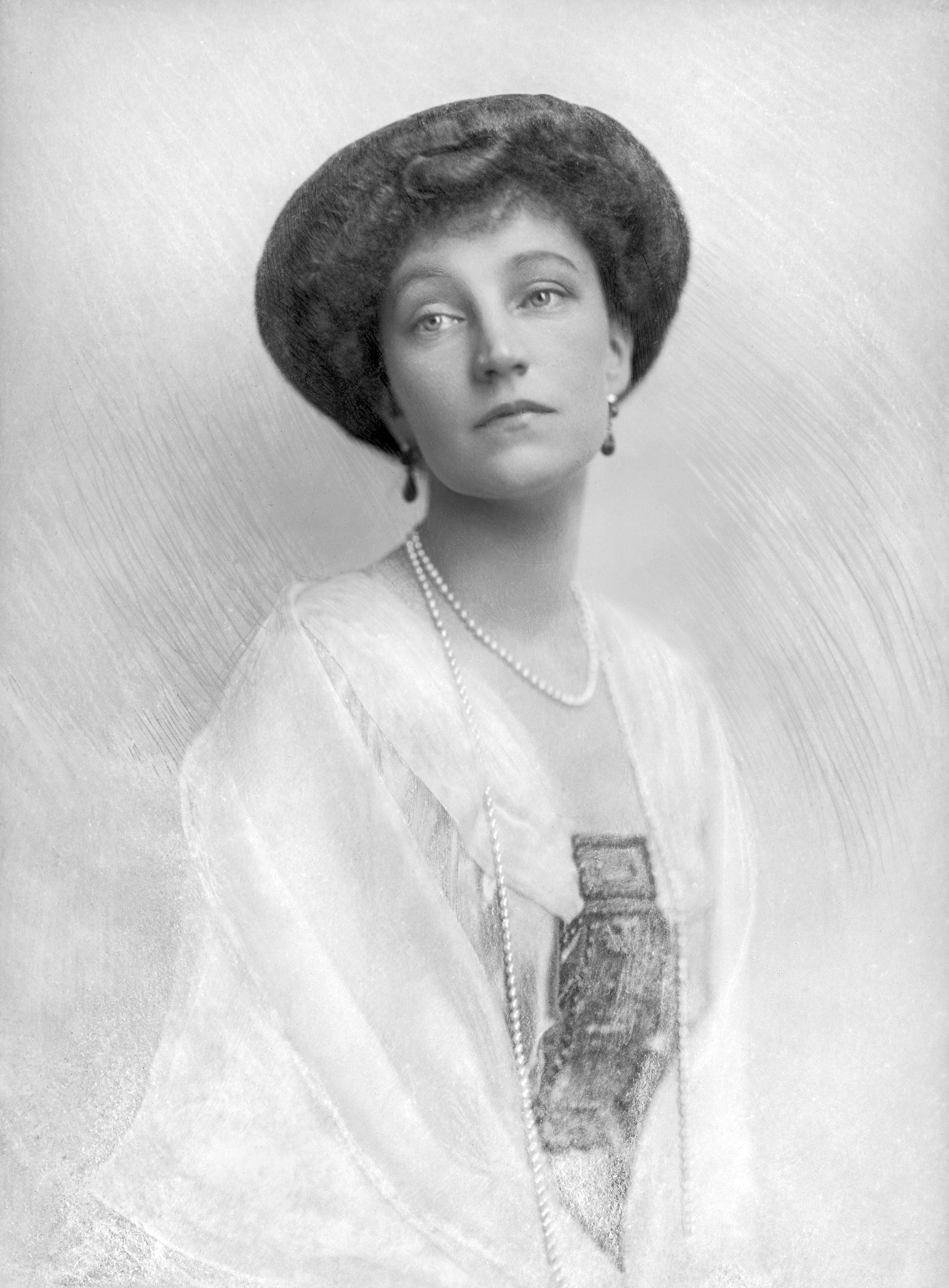
- Photograph by Hermann Clemens Kosel, c. 1911
- Born: 2 September 1883; Franzensburg Castle, Laxenburg, Austria-Hungary
- Died: 16 March 1963 (aged 79); Villa Windisch-Graetz, Hütteldorf, Vienna, Austria
- Burial: Hütteldorfer Friedhof
- Spouse: Prince Otto of Windisch-Graetz (m. 1902; div. 1948) Leopold Petznek (m. 1948; died 1956)
- Issue Detail: Prince Franz Joseph; Prince Ernest; Prince Rudolf; Princess Stephanie
Names
- German: Elisabeth Marie Henriette Stephanie Gisela Habsburg-Lothringen; Hungarian: Habsburg–Lotaringiai Erzsébet Mária Henrietta Stefánia Gizella
- House: Habsburg-Lorraine
- Father: Rudolf, Crown Prince of Austria
- Mother: Princess Stéphanie of Belgium

Archduchess Elisabeth Marie Henriette Stephanie Gisela of Austria (Hungarian: Erzsébet Mária Henrietta Stefánia Gizella; 2 September 1883 – 16 March 1963) was the only child of Rudolf, Crown Prince of Austria, and Princess Stéphanie of Belgium. Her father was the son and heir apparent of Emperor Franz Joseph I of Austria, and her mother was a daughter of King Leopold II of Belgium. She was known to her family as "Erzsi", a diminutive of her name Erzsébet in Hungarian. Later nicknamed The Red Archduchess, she was famous for becoming a socialist and a member of the Austrian Social Democratic Party.

== Early life ==
Archduchess Elisabeth (nicknamed 'Erzsi' – the abbreviation of the Hungarian version of her first name Erzsébet) was born at Schloss Laxenburg on 2 September 1883 to Crown Prince Rudolf and Stéphanie, daughter of King Leopold II of Belgium. She was named after her grandmothers, Empress Elisabeth of Austria and Queen Marie Henriette of Belgium. Erzsi was Franz Joseph's only grandchild through his son.

In 1889, when Erzsi was a little over five years old, her father and Baroness Mary von Vetsera, his mistress, were found dead in what was assumed to be a murder-suicide pact at the Imperial hunting lodge at Mayerling. Her father's death interrupted the dynastic succession within the Austrian imperial family, fractured her grandparents' already tenuous marriage and was a catalyst in Austria-Hungary's gradual destabilization, which culminated in the First World War and the subsequent disintegration of the Habsburg Empire.

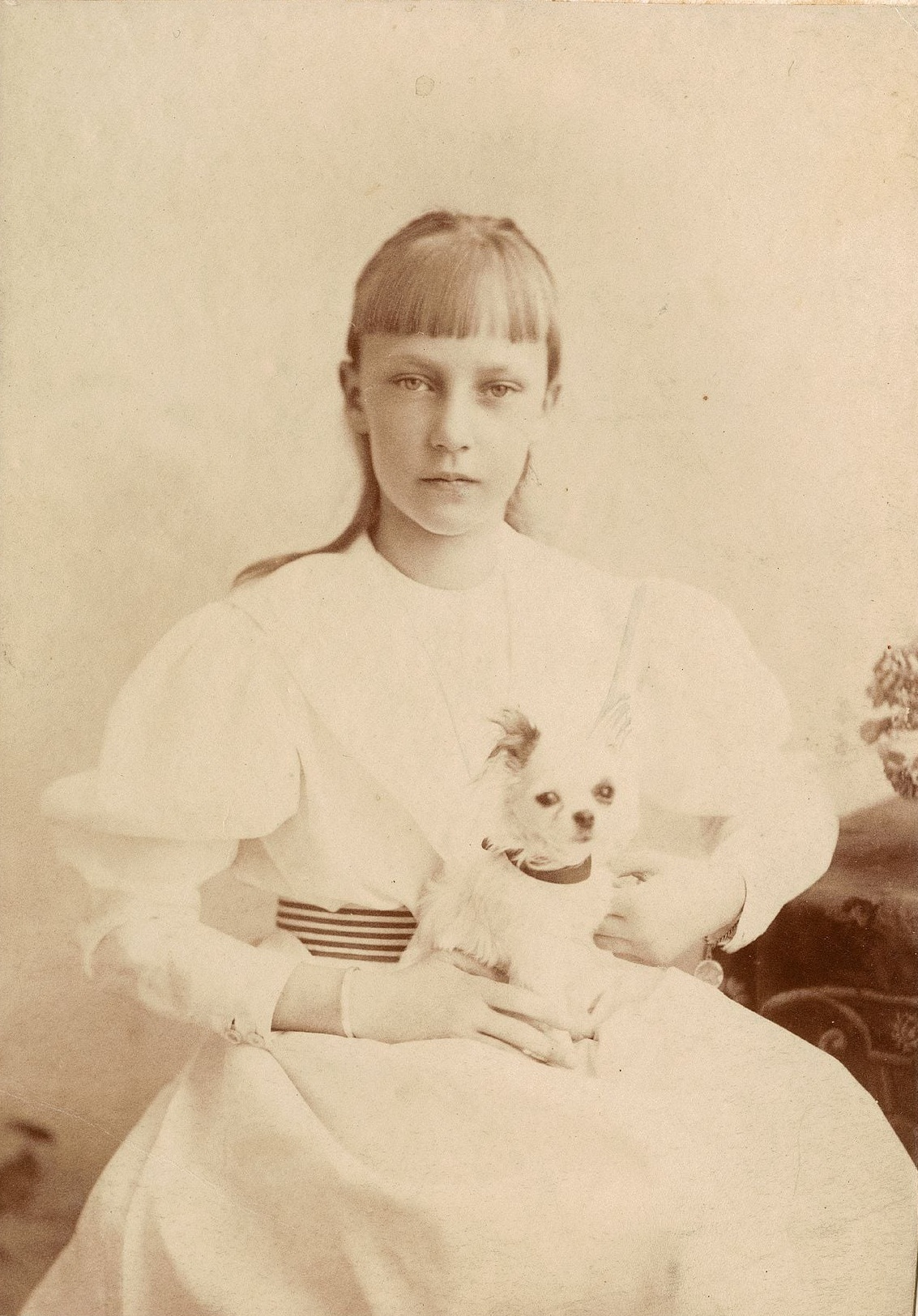
Archduchess Elisabeth Marie of Austria and her dog, c. 1895

After Rudolf's death, Franz Joseph took over guardianship of Erzsi; by his order, she was forbidden to leave Austria with her mother. At a young age she displayed a strong personality, as well as an opposition to the Viennese court.

Her grandmother, the capricious and image obsessed Empress Elisabeth, did not enjoy being identified as a grandmother and was therefore not close to any of her grandchildren. However, after her assassination in 1898, her will specified that, outside a large bequest of the sale of her jewels to benefit charities and religious orders, all of her personal property was bequeathed to Erzsi, her namesake and Rudolf's only child. The Empress made no secret of her dislike of her daughter-in-law prior to the scandal, and after the Mayerling incident, blamed Stéphanie's jealous behavior for her son's depression and suicide. The crown princess was entirely dependent on the Emperor's charity, so the lack of imperial support for Stéphanie following her husband's death negatively affected her relationship with Erzsi, and the mother and child were never close.

In 1900, Stéphanie renounced her title of Crown Princess to marry the Protestant Hungarian count Elemér Lónyay von Nagy-Lónya und Vásáros-Namény (he was eventually made a Prince in 1917 by Emperor Karl I.). Although Emperor Franz Joseph provided his daughter-in-law with a dowry, and Lónyay eventually converted to Catholicism, Erzsi broke off all contact with her mother because she disapproved of the marriage, feeling it was a betrayal of her father's memory. Later, following her marriage, Stéphanie retaliated by disinheriting Erzsi in 1934.

== First marriage ==
Elisabeth was considered a potential bride for several princes in Europe; among them was her cousin Prince Albert, heir presumptive to the throne of Belgium. However, King Leopold II vehemently disapproved of Stéphanie's recent morganatic marriage to Count Elemér Lónyay and thus refused to give Albert his permission. Albert's sister Henriette was horrified at her brother's choice, feeling Elisabeth's background was too unstable for the marriage to be a success.

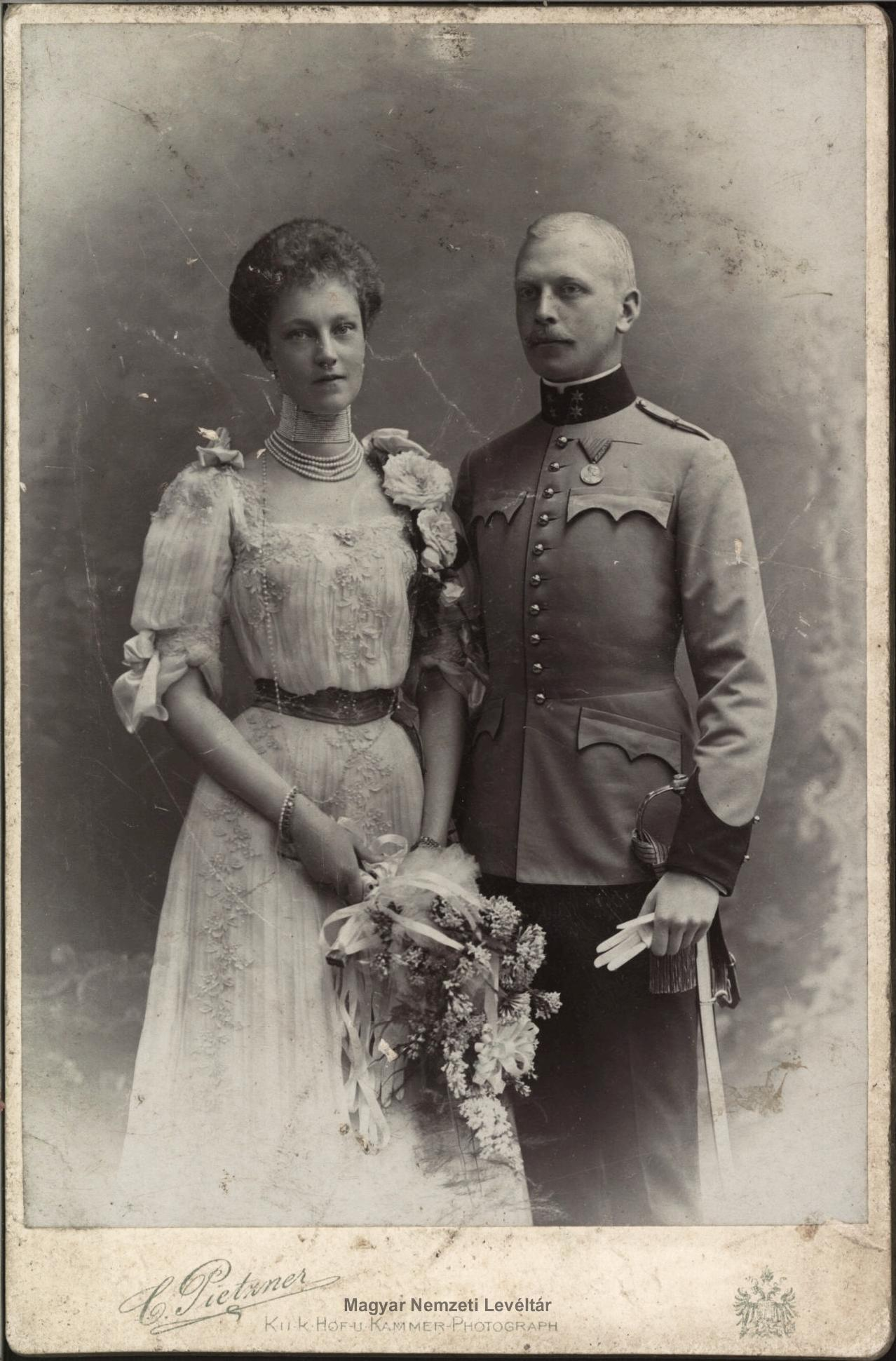
Engagement photo of Archduchess Elisabeth and Prince Otto (January 1902)

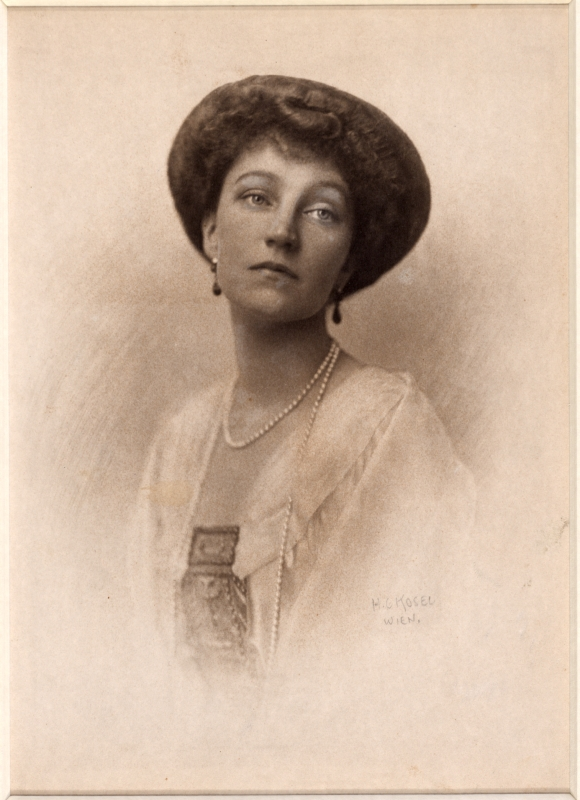
Photo of Archduchess Elisabeth Marie of Austria, 1911, (Bildarchiv Austria)

During a court ball in 1900, Elisabeth met Prince Otto Weriand of Windisch-Graetz (1873–1952), the second son of Prince Ernst Ferdinand Weriand of Windisch-Graetz (1827–1918) and his wife, Princess Kamilla Amalia Caroline Notgera of Oettingen-Oettingen und Oettingen-Spielberg (1845–1888). Ten years her senior, he was below her in rank. Nonetheless, she importuned her grandfather to be allowed to marry him. Franz Joseph resisted at first, having intended for Elisabeth to marry the German Crown Prince, but eventually relented. Elisabeth and Prince Otto were related through her grandmother Sissi. They were third cousins twice removed as Otto was third cousin of the late Empress, both descending from Duke Charles Marie of Arenberg. By many accounts it was Elisabeth alone who wanted the marriage, as Otto was already engaged and was reportedly dumbfounded when Franz Joseph informed him of his new engagement. Ordered by the Emperor to break his "lesser" engagement to marry his granddaughter, he complied.

In order to avoid future succession issues, the Emperor made the marriage conditional on Elisabeth's renouncing her right to succession, although he allowed her to keep her personal title and style, as well as providing her with a generous dowry. While Otto's family was officially listed among the Habsburg-approved families for equal marriages (Ebenbürtigkeit) with an imperial house, the complication lay in the specific branch of his lineage. Otto did not descend from the first Prince of Windisch-Graetz, whose title as Prince of the Holy Roman Empire made his elder line of the Windisch-Graetz family legally equal for dynastic marriages with other royals. Instead, Otto came from the line of his brother, Weriand, who was created Fürst zu Windisch-Graetz only on 18 May 1822 by Francis I, Emperor of Austria. Otto's title of Prince was an Austrian creation, not one of the Holy Roman Empire, and therefore his branch of the family did not meet the Habsburg standard that their members were to marry only into European reigning families or mediatised princely houses—families that descended from former ruling princes of the Holy Roman Empire—rather than from their non-reigning lines. As a result, while his family was considered princely, many regarded the marriage as a mésalliance or even wished it to be treated as morganatic. Because the emperor's favorite granddaughter was involved and Otto's family main-line was legally equal, the marriage was officially treated as equal; however, his branch's technical inferiority remained a point of dispute and could have given Otto's family grounds to press for Elisabeth's dynastic rights should succession circumstances change.

The couple married at the Hofburg on 2 January 1902. On the occasion of the marriage, the Emperor elevated the groom to the personal rank of Fürst, while at the same time his wife was required to renounce all claims to the throne, like many other Archduchesses before her.

They had three sons: Prince Franz Joseph, Prince Ernst and Prince Rudolf. Their last child and only daughter, Princess Stephanie, was born at Ploschkowitz.

The marriage, however, was troubled, and led to unwelcome reminders for the Emperor of his son's death, and possible further scandal for the family:

His granddaughter has lately married the Prince Windischgratz; she was the only daughter of the late Crown Prince Rudolf. The marriage was a love match, but when they had been married only about one year they quarrelled on account of an actress at Prague, who was fired at by the Princess. The actress has since died of the wound. The Emperor, in consequence of this event, did not attend the baptism of the son of the Archduchess Princess Windischgratz. The whole affair caused a painful sensation at the Court in Vienna, though it has been hushed up as most events of the kind are.

== "The Red Archduchess" ==
Throughout their marriage both Elisabeth and Otto were open in having affairs, most notably the former's liaison with the young Austrian naval officer Egon Lerch, who would later command the submarine U-12 during World War I.

Only after the death of Franz Joseph in 1916 and the end of the monarchy in 1918 did the couple officially separate. In 1921 Elisabeth joined the Social Democratic Party, where she met Leopold Petznek from Bruck an der Leitha, then president of the audit office, at one of the election meetings. A teacher and a committed Social Democratic politician who became president of the Lower Austrian Landtag (state parliament) after the war, Petznek came from a modest background, but was highly cultivated. He was also married; his wife, with whom he had a son, was institutionalized at a psychiatric hospital in Mauer-Ohling, where she died on 9 June 1935.

The lengthy legal process dragged on, and it was not until March 1924 that Elisabeth was able to obtain a judicial separation. A custody battle for their four children ensued. Originally the court granted Elisabeth custody of the two elder sons, while their younger son and daughter were to live with Otto. She is supposed to have prevented this either by presenting Otto with a house full of armed Socialists when he came to remove them, or else by threatening him with suicide should she have to give them up. In any event, Elisabeth ultimately retained custody of all four children. Elisabeth doted on her children when they were young, but her relationship with them deteriorated as they grew older. Rudolf, in accordance with her socialist views, was reportedly taken out of school and put to work in a factory. Elisabeth and her daughter Stephanie did not have a good relationship; she reportedly stated that she married her first husband based on the fact that her mother did not like him.

Elisabeth moved to her villa in Hütteldorf, a district of Vienna, which she had inherited from her father. She lived with Petznek for the next twenty years. She was at his side at Social Democratic marches and meetings, where she was accepted and accorded great respect. Leopold, however, due to his "haughty" character, was not welcome in aristocratic circles. In 1934 her husband and son made a legal motion to place her under a conservatorship on the grounds that she had squandered profits from the sale of the couple's property in numerous donations, made in order to join the Social Democrats. The motion was later dropped. Although divorce became legal in 1938, when Austria became part of Germany and adopted German law after the Anschluss, Elisabeth was not able to divorce her husband until after the end of the war.

== Second marriage ==
In late 1933 Petznek was arrested and imprisoned by the Austrian government until July 1934. In 1944, he was arrested by the Nazis and sent to Dachau concentration camp until the camp was liberated by the Americans in March 1945. After the war he became the first President of the Austrian Federal Court of Audit. Since Elisabeth had renounced her official title of Archduchess to the House of Habsburg at the time of her first marriage, the new Habsburg Laws did not apply to her; she was allowed to stay in Austria and retain her personal possessions. She formally divorced Prince Otto in early 1948, and on 4 May 1948 she and Leopold married in a registry office in Vienna.

When Vienna was occupied by the Red Army, Elisabeth's villa was commandeered and then ransacked by Soviet soldiers. When Hütteldorf became part of the French occupied zone, the villa was occupied by General Béthouart; Elisabeth and Leopold were not allowed to return until 1955, when the Allied occupation ended. By then both were in poor health: Petznek died in July 1956 from a heart attack, while Elisabeth, who used a wheelchair due to gout, bred German Shepherds, but became reclusive until her death in 1963.

== Aftermath ==
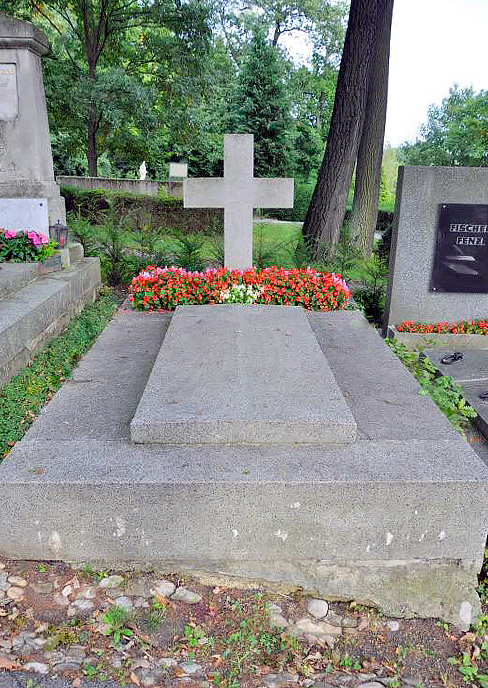
Unmarked grave of Elisabeth Marie and Leopold Petznek: Grave 29, Group 22.

On her deathbed, she ordered her staff to close her villa against her two surviving children and call for a police detail to secure her belongings until the Ministry of Education could remove them. Only her daughter Stephanie was allowed to see her for a few moments, in the presence of her servants.

Archduchess Elisabeth had willed some 500 heirlooms, owned by the Habsburg Imperial family, to the Republic of Austria.

Over the objections of her first husband, Prince Otto, who thought they should go to their children, she wanted all art and books to "be put back in their former places", as she did not believe Imperial property should be sold at auction or come into the possession of foreigners; these pieces are in museums in Vienna today.

== Death ==
She died in Vienna on 16 March 1963, aged 79. According to her wishes, she was buried with her second husband in an unmarked grave at the Hütteldorfer Friedhof in Vienna, close to the house where she spent her last years.

Since 1995, the villa has been in the possession of the international Buddhist community Soka Gakkai International.

== Honours ==
- Austria-Hungary: Dame of the Order of the Starry Cross

== Issue ==
1. Franz Joseph (1904 in Prague – 1981 in Nairobi), m. in 1934 Countess Ghislaine d'Arschot Schoonhoven (1912–1997) and had:
  1. Stéphanie Windisch-Graetz (1939–2019) became an artist, known for her photographic portraits using only candles as a source of light and for her sensual images from the animal world. She married Dermot Blundell-Hollinshead-Blundell (1935–2009) (a descendant of Nicholas Blundell). They were the parents of:
    1. Henry Victor William Blundell-Hollinshead-Blundell (born 1967)
    2. Alexander Otto Blundell-Hollinshead-Blundell (born 1969), whose surname was changed to "de Windisch-Graetz" in Belgium in 2011.
  2. Guillaume Franz Josef Maria Windisch-Graetz (born 1950; unmarried).
2. Ernst (1905–1952), m. in 1927 Helena Skinner (1906–1982) and in 1947 Baroness Eva Marcelline Jacqueline Marie von Isbary (b. 1921), daughter of Lothar Rudolf Walter, Baron von Isabry (1887–1963), and Aloisia Klepsch-Kloth von Roden (1899–1964). He had:
  1. Otto Ernst Wilhelm (1928–2013)
  2. Stephanie Maria Magdalena (1933–2015)
  3. Eleonore Aloysia Elisabeth Maria (b. 1947)
  4. Elisabeth Maria Eva Margarita (b. 1951)
3. Rudolf (1907–1930), never married and had no issue;
4. Stephanie (1909–2005), m. in 1934 Pierre d'Alcantara de Querrieu (1907–1944) and in 1945 Karl Axel Björklund (1906–1986) and had:
  1. Alvar Etienne d'Alcantara de Querrieu (1935–2019)
  2. Bjorn-Axel Björklund (1944–1995)

== Ancestry ==
Ancestors of Archduchess Elisabeth Marie of Austria

8. Archduke Franz Karl of Austria
4. Franz Joseph I of Austria
9. Princess Sophie of Bavaria
2. Rudolf, Crown Prince of Austria
10. Duke Maximilian Joseph in Bavaria
5. Duchess Elisabeth in Bavaria
11. Princess Ludovika of Bavaria
1. Archduchess Elisabeth Marie of Austria
12. Leopold I of Belgium
6. Leopold II of Belgium
13. Princess Louise of Orléans
3. Princess Stéphanie of Belgium
14. Archduke Joseph, Palatine of Hungary
7. Archduchess Marie Henriette of Austria
15. Duchess Maria Dorothea of Württemberg

== See also ==
- Princess María Teresa of Bourbon-Parma, fellow socialist Royal, nicknamed "the Red Princess"
