= Princess Stephanie of Windisch-Graetz =

Princess Stephanie
- Countess Pierre d'Alcantara de Querrieu
- Stephanie of Windisch-Graetz with her mother
- Born: 9 July 1909; Ploskovice, Bohemia
- Died: 7 September 2005 (aged 96); Uccle, Belgium
- Spouse: Count Pierre d'Alcantara de Querrieu (m. 1933; died 1944) Karl-Axel Björklund (m. 1945; died 1986)
- Issue: Alvar Etienne d'Alcantara de Querrieu; Björn-Axel Björklund
- House: Windisch-Graetz
- Father: Prince Otto of Windisch-Graetz
- Mother: Archduchess Elisabeth Marie of Austria

Princess Stephanie of Windisch-Graetz (9 July 1909 in Ploskovice, Bohemia – 7 September 2005 in Uccle, Belgium) was the daughter of Archduchess Elisabeth Marie of Austria (1883–1963), only child of Crown Prince Rudolf of Austria and Princess Stéphanie of Belgium, and of Prince Otto Weriand of Windisch-Graetz (1873–1952). She was the great-grandchild of Emperor Franz-Joseph and Empress Elisabeth ('Sissi') of Austria. She was also the great-grandchild of King Leopold II of Belgium.

Her full name was Stéphanie Eleonore Maria Elisabeth Kamilla Philomena Veronika zu Windisch-Grätz in German, and Stéphanie Éléonore Marie Élisabeth Camille Philomène Véronique de Windisch-Grätz in French. She may have been named after her maternal grandmother, Princess Stéphanie of Belgium. Her nickname in the family was Fée.

== Parents' separation, effect on life ==
As a child she suffered greatly from her mother's frequent absences, and her parents' inharmonious marriage. The couple separated in 1924 and divorced in 1948. Her mother went to Brussels with the four children, where Princess Clementine of Belgium offered refuge.

In 1921, Archduchess Elisabeth had begun a relationship with the Austrian socialist member of parliament Leopold Petznek, whom she eventually married in 1948. Stéphanie got along well with her stepfather. Her relationship with her mother was not very good, and worsened after her second marriage. Archduchess Elisabeth did not like Karl-Axel Björklund, and forbade him entry to her house. Stéphanie provided financial support to her father Otto Weriand in later life.

Stéphanie had three elder brothers:

- Prince Franz Joseph zu Windisch-Grätz (1904–1981)
- Prince Ernst zu Windisch-Grätz (1905–1952)
- Prince Rudolf zu Windisch-Grätz (1907–1939)

== First marriage ==
In 1933, Stéphanie married Count Pierre d'Alcantara de Querrieu (2 November 1907 – 14 October 1944). Count d'Alcantara was the son of Jean d'Alcantara de Querrieu and Baroness Marie-Lucie t'Kint de Roodenbeeke. Count d'Alcantara was a member of the household of King Leopold III. In 1942 he was arrested by the Gestapo and died two years later in the Sachsenhausen concentration camp. She had one child by her first husband:

- Count Alvar Etienne d'Alcantara de Querrieu (30 July 1935 – 5 August 2019)

== Second marriage ==
In 1945, after the death of her husband, she married Karl-Axel Björklund (1906–1986). She had one child by her second husband:

- Bjorn-Axel Björklund (20 October 1944 – 7 September 1995)

== Later life ==
During her long life, Stéphanie traveled extensively, especially in Africa, where her brother François-Joseph lived in Kenya, and also in South America, particularly in Argentina.

== Ancestry ==
Ancestors of Princess Stephanie of Windisch-Graetz

8. Weriand, 1st Prince of Windisch-Graetz
4. Prince Ernst Ferdinand of Windisch-Graetz
9. Princess Eleonore of Lobkowicz
2. Prince Otto of Windisch-Graetz
10. Otto Karl, Prince of Oettingen-Spielberg
5. Princess Camilla of Oettingen-Spielberg
11. Countess Georgina of Königsegg-Aulendorf
1. Princess Stephanie of Windisch-Graetz
12. Franz Joseph I of Austria
6. Rudolf, Crown Prince of Austria
13. Duchess Elisabeth in Bavaria
3. Archduchess Elisabeth Marie of Austria
14. Leopold II of Belgium
7. Princess Stéphanie of Belgium
15. Archduchess Marie Henriette of Austria

== Sources ==
- Ghislaine Windisch-Graetz, née d'Arschot Schoonhoven, Kaiseradler und rote Nelke: Das Leben der Tochter des Kronprinzen Rudolf, 1988
- Friedrich Weissensteiner, L'Archiduchesse rouge, Payot, Paris, 2010
- Oscar Coomans de Brachène, Etat présent de la noblesse belge, annuaire 2003, Brussels, 2003.
