= Prince Otto of Windisch-Graetz =

Austrian nobleman (1873–1952)

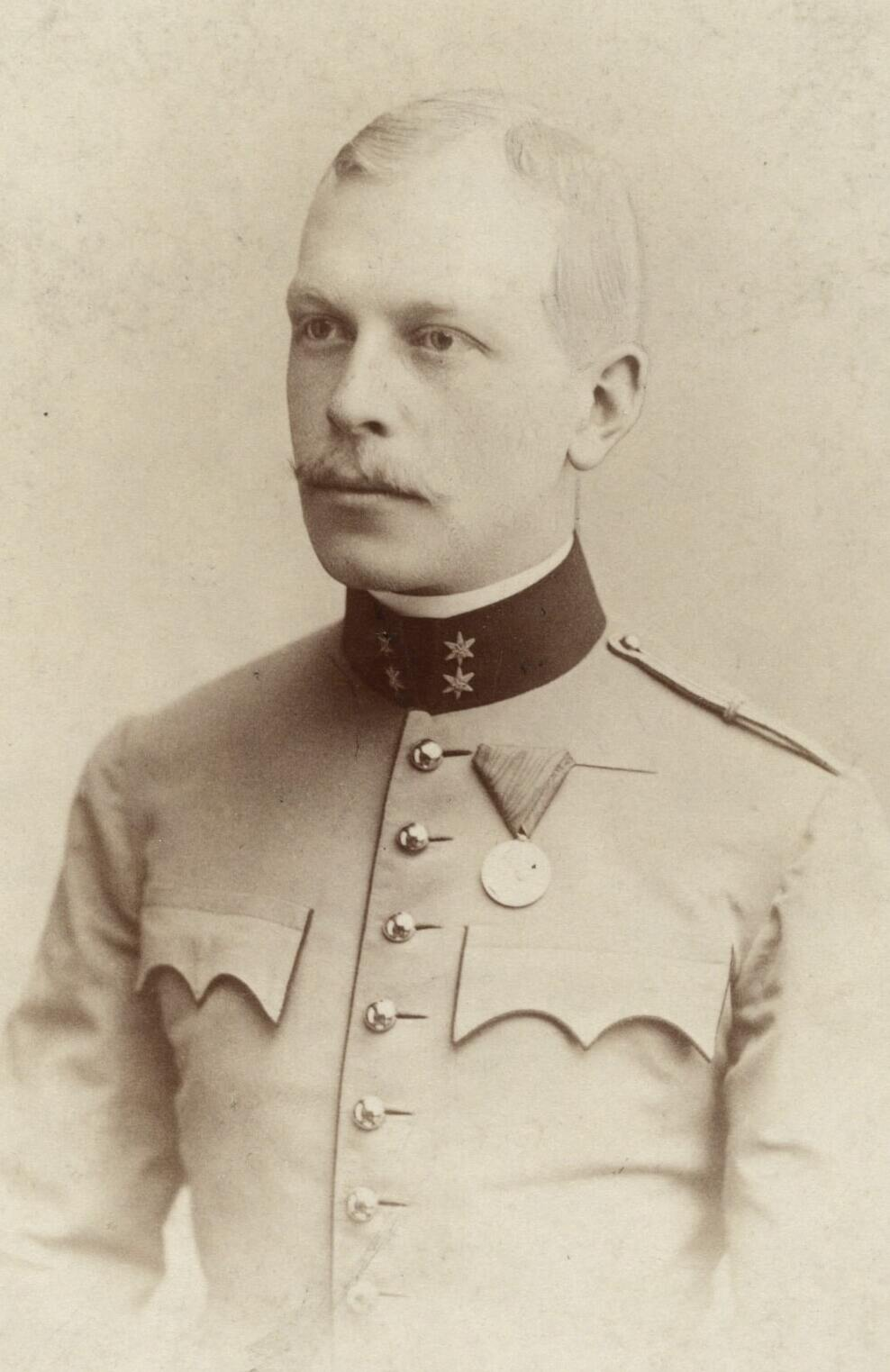
- Prince Otto, 1900.
- Born: Otto Weriand Hugo Ernst Prince of Windisch-Graetz; October 7, 1873; Graz, Austria-Hungary
- Died: December 27, 1952 (aged 79); Lugano, Switzerland
- Buried: Lugano-Castagnola Cemetery, Switzerland
- Noble family: House of Windisch-Graetz
- Spouse: Archduchess Elisabeth Marie of Austria (m. 1902; div. 1948)
- Issue: Prince Franz Josef; Prince Ernst; Prince Rudolf Johann; Princess Stephanie
- Father: Prince Ernst Ferdinand Weriand of Windisch-Graetz
- Mother: Princess Kamilla of Oettingen-Oettingen and Oettingen-Spielberg
- Occupation: Military officer, sports administrator

Prince Otto of Windisch-Graetz (born 7 October 1873 in Graz as Otto Weriand Hugo Ernst Prince of Windisch-Graetz, from 1902 Fürst of Windisch-Graetz; died 27 December 1952 in Lugano) was an Austrian nobleman, who became known through his marriage to Archduchess Elisabeth Marie of Austria, the so-called “Red Archduchess”.

== Early life ==
Otto was born into the House of Windisch-Graetz, one of the most distinguished noble houses of Austrian high nobility, as the second son of Prince Ernst Ferdinand Weriand of Windisch-Graetz (1827-1918) and his wife, Princess Kamilla of Oettingen-Oettingen and Oettingen-Spielberg (1845-1888).

== Military career ==
In 1891 he entered the Imperial and Royal Cavalry Cadet School in Hranice as a student, completing the curriculum in two years with moderate success. From 1894 to 1895 he attended the brigade officer school in Olomouc and was promoted to lieutenant on 1 May 1895. After two years stationed in Brno, he was appointed captain in 1899 and entered the war school, from which he graduated in 1901 with good results.

During World War I he commanded a battalion on the Italian front.

=== Marriage to Archduchess Elisabeth ===
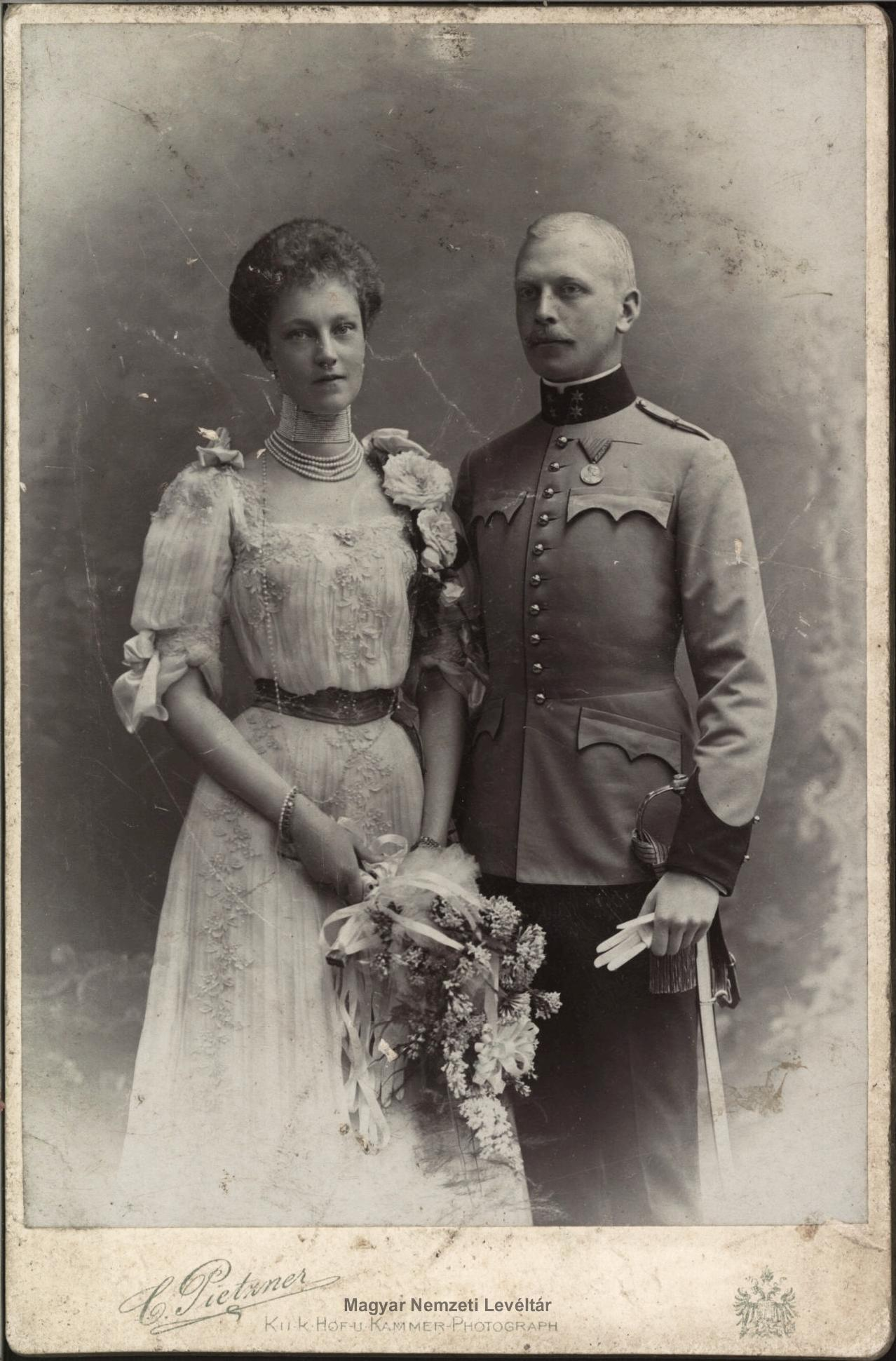
Archduchess Elisabeth and Prince Otto zu Windisch-Graetz

In September 1900, Archduchess Elisabeth Marie of Austria (1883–1963), daughter of Crown Prince Rudolf and Crown Princess Stéphanie and granddaughter of Emperor Franz Joseph I and Empress Elisabeth of Austria, fell in love with Prince Otto. However, he was ten years her senior and below her in rank. Although his family belonged to the high nobility, they were no longer part of the circle of sovereign families, but belonged to Mediatised Houses. Nevertheless, as she was the Emperor's favorite granddaughter and Otto's family was legally considered equal for dynastic purposes (as were marriages with all other Mediatized princely families), the marriage was officially treated as equal. On the occasion of the marriage on 23 January 1902 in Vienna, the Emperor elevated the groom to the personal rank of Fürst, while at the same time his wife was required to renounce all claims to the throne, like many other Archduchesses before her.

The couple separated after an unhappy marriage in 1919, and were divorced in 1948. A custody battle raged for years over the four children they had together.

=== Involvement in sports ===
Otto was cited as an excellent horseman and a very good swimmer, gymnast and fencer. In 1911 he became Honorary President of the Austrian Sports Federation. In this capacity he was appointed to the International Olympic Committee (IOC) in 1911. He opened the Olympic Congress in Paris in 1914 as the highest-ranking noble member of the IOC.

However, because of Austria's role in World War I, his IOC membership was suspended in 1919. When the IOC decided in the 1921 season to reinstate Windisch-Graetz's membership, he refused on the grounds that he no longer resided in Austria (see below).

=== From 1918 until death ===
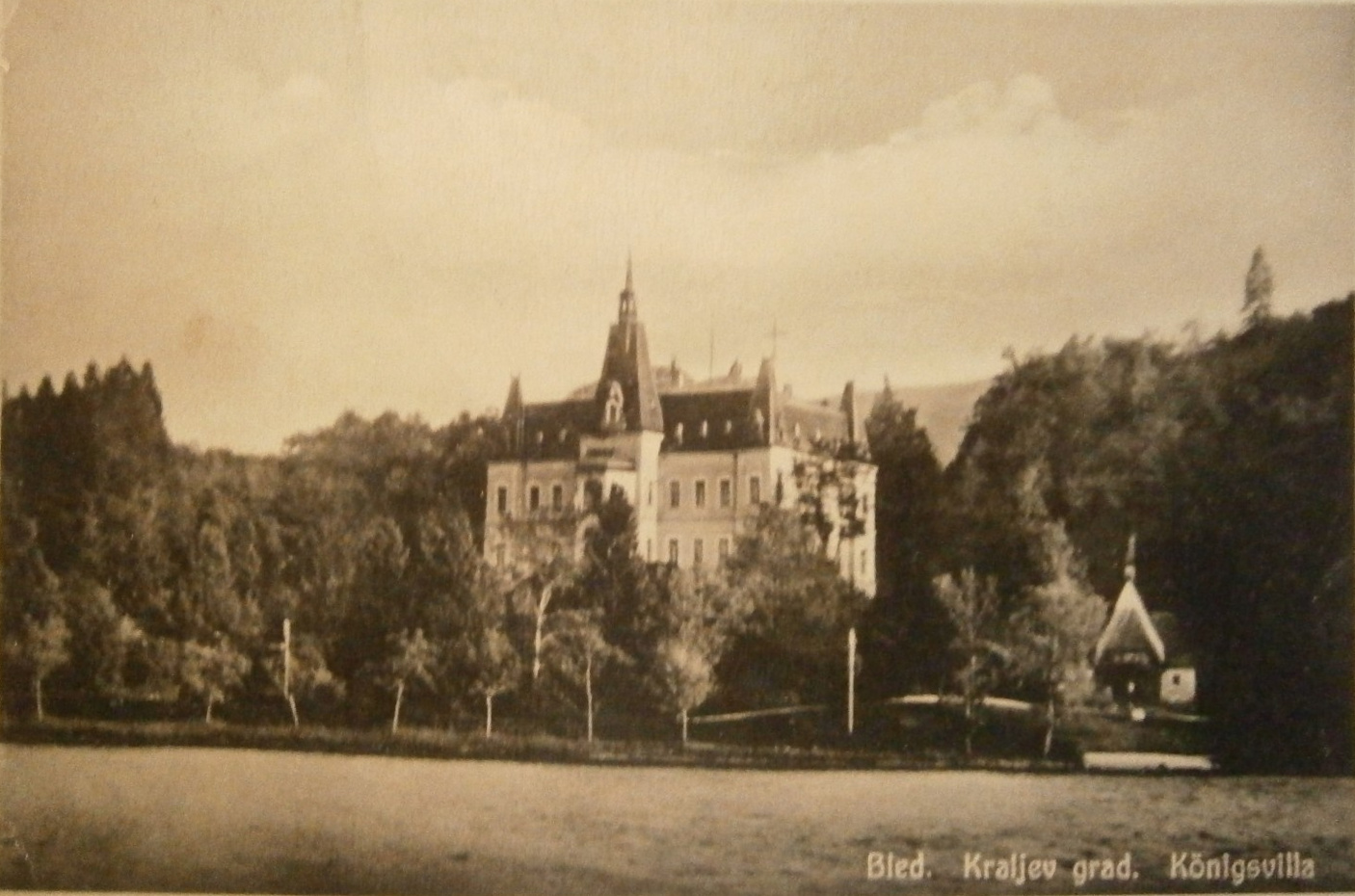
Castle Suvobor near Bled in Slovenia (1920s)

After World War I (1914–1918) Otto became a Yugoslav citizen and lived on the vast lands near Bled (in present-day Slovenia), which he had inherited from his family. The lands, including a castle which served as his summer residence (later named Suvobor castle by the King of Yugoslavia) were sold in 1922 to King Alexander I of Yugoslavia.

He spent World War II with his sister, Countess Eleonore Marie Gabriele Georgine Amalie von Paar (1877-1977), at her palace in Bohemia. After the war they relocated to Switzerland, where they lived together in Lausanne.

Prince Otto of Windisch-Graetz died on 27 December 1952 in Lugano, aged 89. He is buried in the Lugano-Castagnola cemetery in Switzerland.

== Descendants ==
1. Franz Josef Windisch-Graetz (born 1904 in Prague; died 1981 in Nairobi), born and until 1919 as Franz Josef Marie Otto Antonius Ignatius Oktavianus Prince of Windisch-Graetz:
  1. married (1934 in Brussels) Ghislaine Windisch-Graetz (born 1912 in Ixelles; died 1997 in Namur), née Countess d'Arschot Schoonhoven
2. Ernst Windisch-Graetz (born 1905 in Prague; died 1952 in Vienna), born and until 1919 as Ernst Weriand Maria Otto Antonius Expeditus Anselmus Prince of Windisch-Graetz:
  1. married (1927 in Vienna) Ellen Windisch-Graetz (born 1906 in Scheibbs; died 1982 in Vienna), née Ellen Skinner; divorced 1938, annulled 1940;
  2. married (1947 in Schwarzenbach an der Pielach) Eva Windisch-Graetz (born 1921 in Vienna), née Baroness von Isbary.
3. Rudolf Johann Windisch-Graetz (born 1907 in Ploschkowitz (Ploskovice); died 1939 in Vienna), born and until 1919 as Rudolf Johann Maria Otto Joseph Anton Andreas Prince of Windisch-Graetz.
4. Stephanie Björklund, by marriage Countess d’Alcantara de Querrieu (born 1909 in Ploschkowitz (Ploskovice); died 2005 in Uccle), born and until 1919 as Princess Stefanie of Windisch-Graetz Eleonore Maria Elisabeth Kamilla Philomena Veronika zu Windisch-Graetz:
  1. married (1933 in Brussels) Count Pierre d’Alcantara de Querrieu (born 1907 in Bachte-Maria-Leerne/Deinze; died 1944 Sachsenhausen concentration camp);
  2. married (1945 in Brüssel) Carl Axel Björklund (born 1906 in Högsjö; died 1986 in Anderlecht).

== Bibliography ==
- Windisch-Graetz, Ghislaine (1992). Kaiseradler und rote Nelken. Das Leben der Tochter des Kronprinzen Rudolf [Imperial eagle and red carnations. The Life of the Daughter of Crown Prince Rudolf] (in German). Vienna/Munich: Amalthea. ISBN 3-85002-264-1.
