= Bukovje, Brežice =

Bukovje
- Location in Slovenia
- Coordinates: 46°2′1.02″N 15°42′20.66″E
- Country: Slovenia
- Traditional region: Styria
- Statistical region: Lower Sava
- Municipality: Brežice

Area
  - Total: 2.41 km^{2} (0.93 sq mi)
- Elevation: 358.1 m (1,175 ft)

Population (2020)
  - Total: 61
  - Density: 25/km^{2} (66/sq mi)

Bukovje (pronounced [ˈbuːkɔu̯jɛ]; German: Buchdorf) is a settlement in the hills north of Bizeljsko in the Municipality of Brežice in eastern Slovenia. The area is part of the traditional region of Styria. It is now included with the rest of the municipality in the Lower Sava Statistical Region. It includes the hamlets of Graben to the west, which partially lies in the valley of Sračjak Creek, and Žalce (German: Schalze), just above the Sotla River.

== Name ==
The name Bukovje is derived from the word buk 'beech'. Like similar names (e.g., Bukovica, Bukovec, Bukovci), it originally referred to the local vegetation. In the past the German name was Buchdorf (literally, 'beech village').

== Church ==
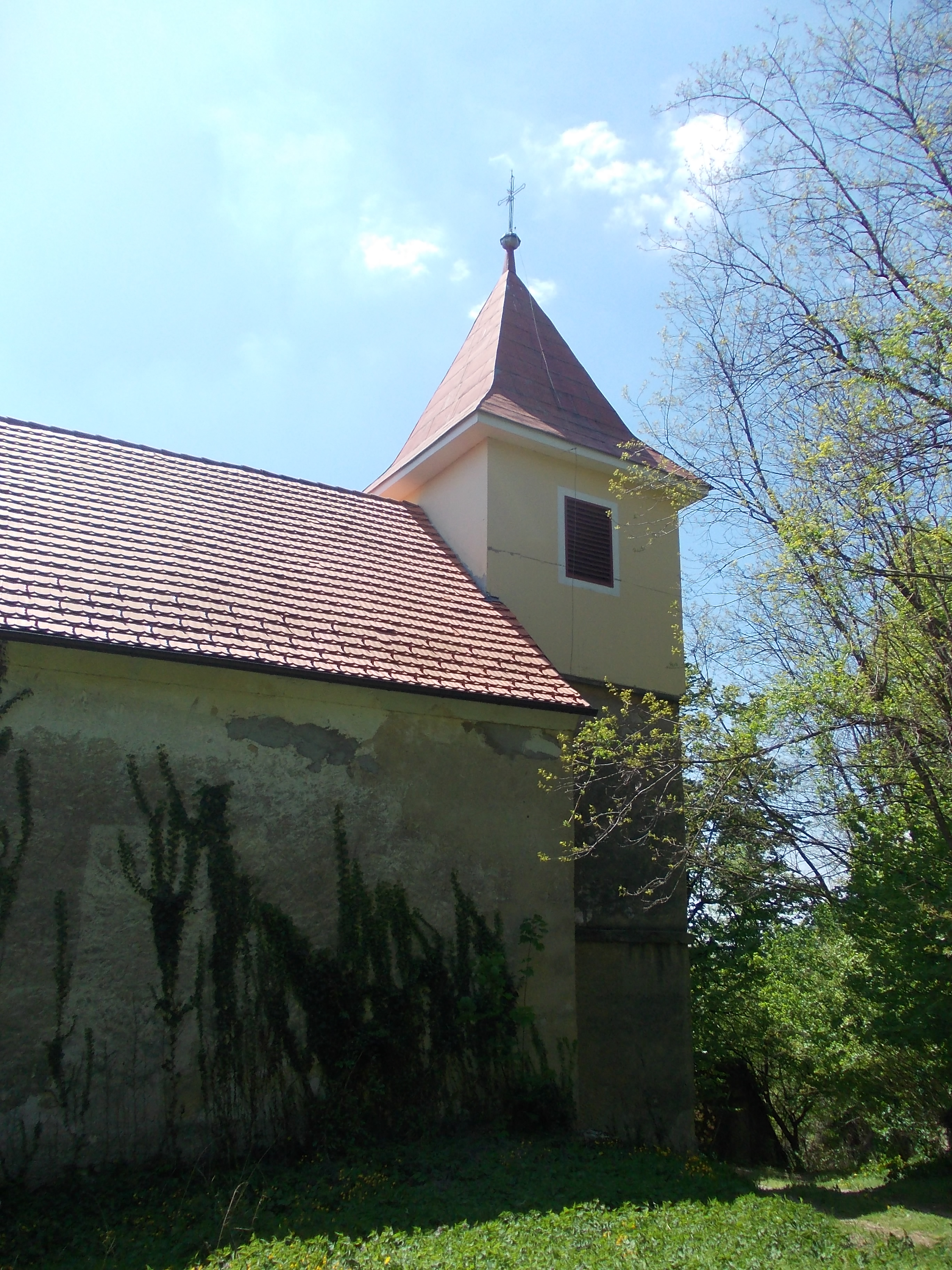
Saint Anthony the Great Church

The local church south of the settlement is a pilgrimage church dedicated to Saint Anthony and belongs to the Parish of Bizeljsko. It was built in the 17th century, vaulted in the 18th century, and extended in the 19th century, when the belfry was also remodelled. It has a rectangular nave and a chancel enclosed on three sides. The altar dates from the mid-18th century and the paintings in the church are the work of Simon Ogrin (1851–1930).

== Cultural heritage ==
In addition to Saint Anthony's Church, two other structures in Bukovje are registered as cultural heritage:

- The house at Bukovje no. 10 stands on the local road from Bizeljsko to Bukovje, west of the Church of Saint Anthony. It is a single-story plastered stone house from the 19th century with a projecting front entrance and dormer.
- The Lusthaus Pavilion stands on a small level area among the vineyards and is visible from the road from Bizeljsko. It is an octagonal structure from the 19th century and is part of the former estate of Bizeljsko Castle.

== History ==
During the Second World War several farm buildings in the village were destroyed. In the fall of 1941 the Germans evicted 135 villagers in order to settle Kočevje Germans and Bessarabia Germans in their place.
