= Bizeljska Vas =

- Location in Slovenia
- Coordinates: 46°2′36.24″N 15°41′42.5″E
- Country: Slovenia
- Traditional region: Styria
- Statistical region: Lower Sava
- Municipality: Brežice

Area
  - Total: 1.38 km^{2} (0.53 sq mi)
- Elevation: 305.8 m (1,003 ft)

Population (2020)
  - Total: 43
  - Density: 31/km^{2} (81/sq mi)

Bizeljska Vas (pronounced [biˈzeːlska ˈʋaːs]; Slovene: Bizeljska vas, German: Wiselldorf) is a small settlement in the Municipality of Brežice in eastern Slovenia. It lies in the hills north of Bizeljsko. The area is part of the traditional region of Styria. It is now included in the Lower Sava Statistical Region. It includes the hamlets of Ciglanca (in older sources also Ciglonca, German: Ziegelstätte), Prekošnica, Stičnica, Maslarjev Breg, Podgrad, and Sračjek.

== Castle ==
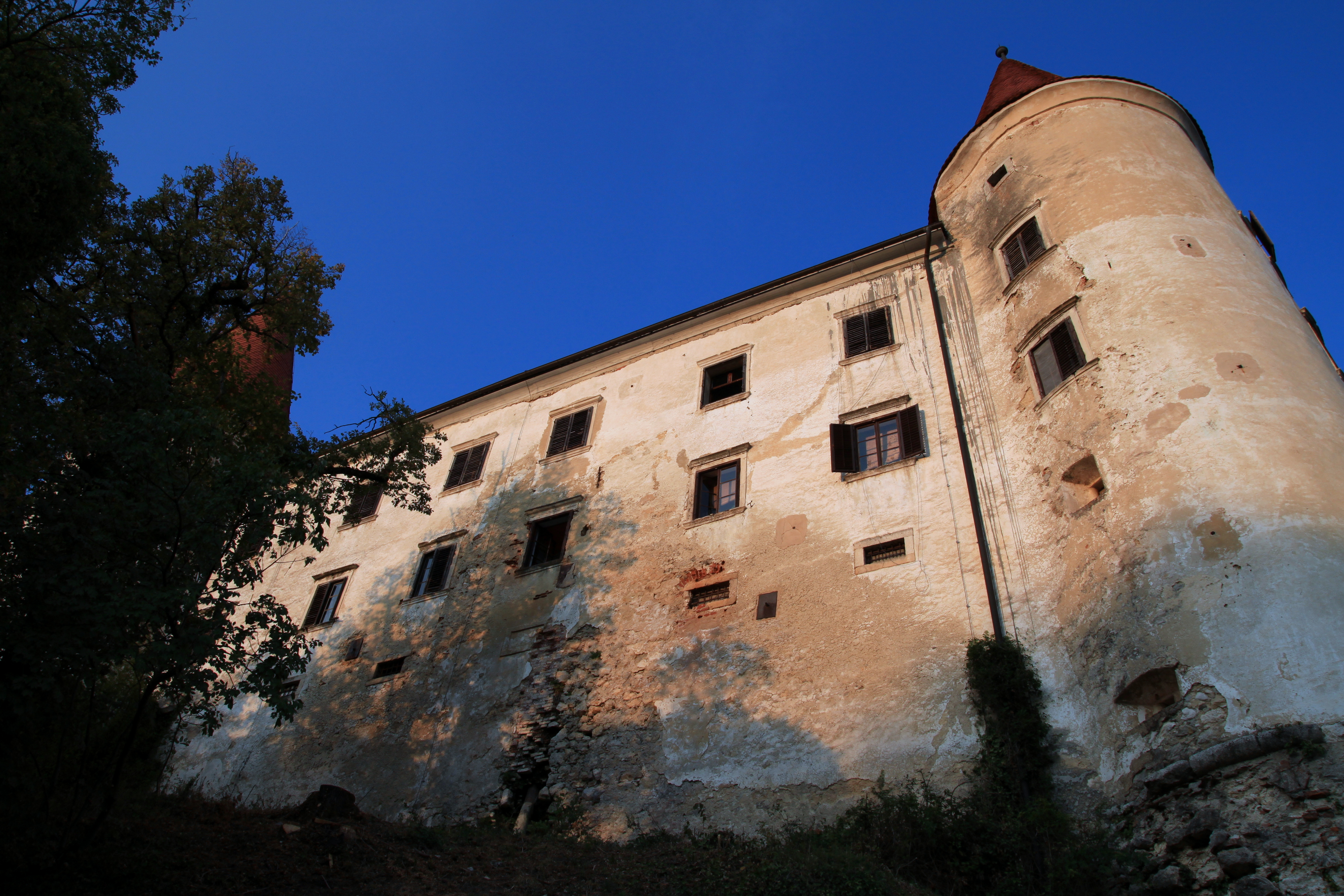
Bizeljsko Castle

Bizeljsko Castle is a castle on a hill above the settlement. It was originally built in the 16th and 17th centuries with a number of later additions including two rounded corner towers and a Baroque castle chapel. It has been protected as a cultural monument of national significance.
