= Stéphanie Windisch-Graetz =

Belgian photographic artist (1939–2019)

Princess Stéphanie Windisch-Graetz (17 July 1939 – 12 July 2019) was the daughter of Prince Franz Joseph zu Windisch-Graetz and granddaughter of Archduchess Elisabeth Marie of Austria. Archduchess Elisabeth was the daughter of Rudolf, Crown Prince of Austria and granddaughter of Emperor Franz Joseph I of Austria.

She became an artist, known for her photographic portraits using only candles as a source of light, and for her sensual images from the animal world. She married Dermot Blundell-Hollinshead-Blundell (1935–2009), grandson of British army officer Dermot Blundell. They were the parents of Henry Victor William Blundell-Hollinshead-Blundell (born 1967) and Alexander Otto Blundell-Hollinshead-Blundell (born 1969) who adopted the surname of his mother in 2011. She had one younger brother, Prince Guillaume Franz Josef Maria Windisch-Graetz (born 1950; unmarried). She died in a hospital in Woluwe-Saint-Lambert on 12 July 2019 due to complications after a heart operation.

Following male preference primogeniture, she is one possible claimant to the Byzantine Empire through her paternal grandmother.
