= Windisch-Graetz =

Austrian noble family

House of Windisch-Graetz
- Uradel
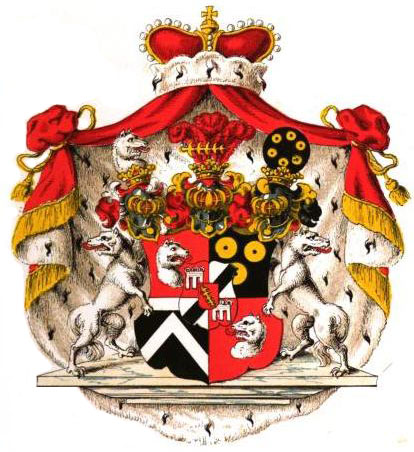
- Country: Holy Roman Empire; Austrian Empire; Slovenia (Origin); Kingdom of Bohemia
- Founded: 13th century (first recorded 1242)
- Current head: Anton, 6th Prince (Elder Line); Mariano Hugo, 6th Prince (Younger Line)
- Titles: Prince of the Holy Roman Empire (1804); Prince of the Austrian Empire (1822); Imperial Count (1682); Freiherr (1551)
- Estates: Tachov Palace; Kladruby Abbey; Sárospatak Castle; Siggen (current)
- Cadet branches: Elder Line (Primogenitur); Younger Line (Secundogenitur)

The House of Windisch-Graetz, also spelled Windischgrätz, is an ancient Austrian aristocratic family, descending from Windischgrätz in Lower Styria (present-day Slovenj Gradec, Slovenia). The noble dynasty serving the House of Habsburg achieved the rank of Freiherren in 1551, of Imperial Counts in 1682 and of Princes of the Holy Roman Empire in 1804. As a mediatised house, the family belongs to high nobility.

== History ==
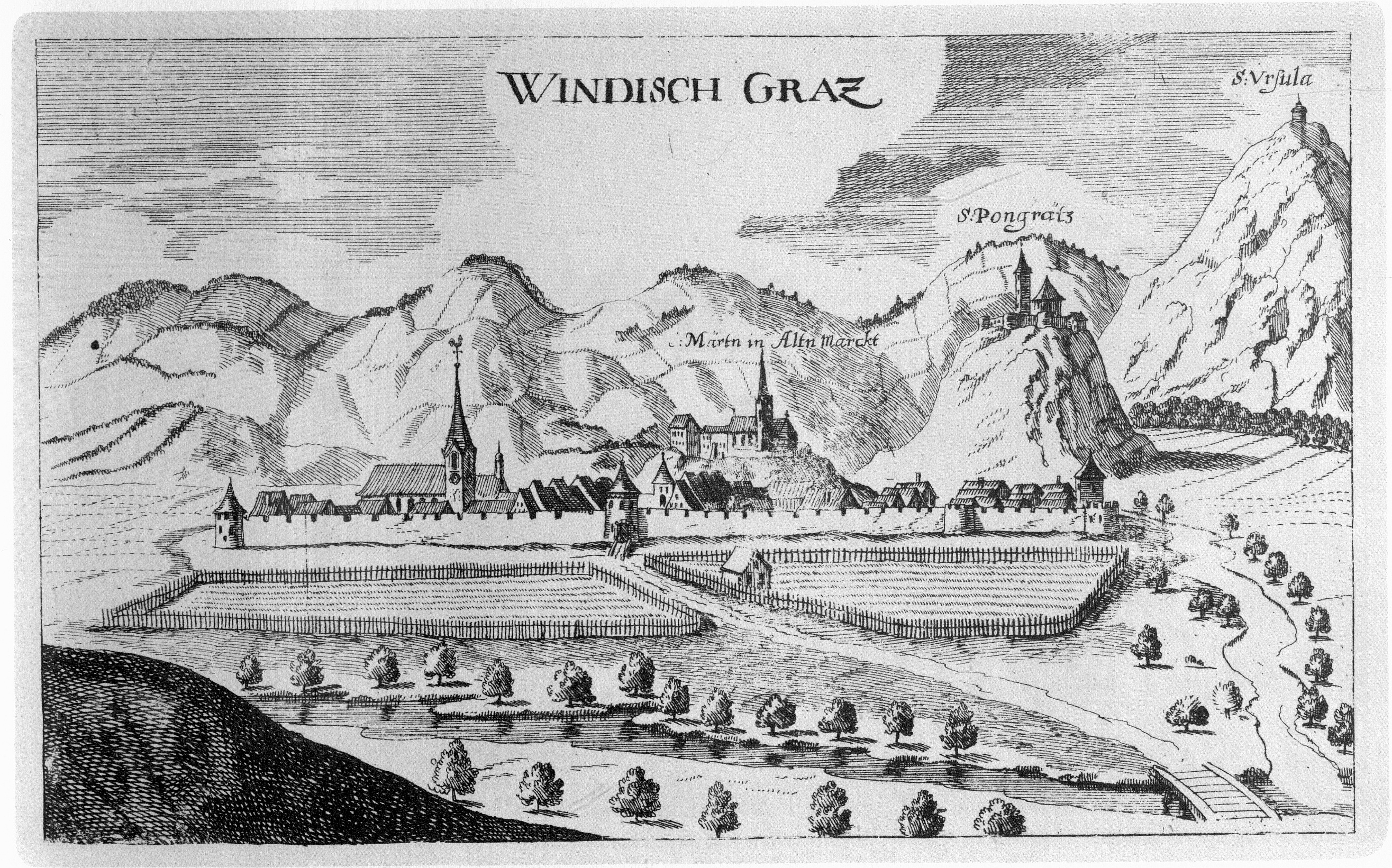
Windischgrätz in Slovene Styria (1681)

According to the Almanach de Gotha, the family was first recorded in 1242. They temporarily served as ministeriales of the Patriarchs of Aquileia, owners of Windischgrätz until the mid 14th century. One Conrad of Windischgracz (d. 1339) acted as a Habsburg administrator in the Habsburg Duchy of Styria from 1323 onwards. The family owned Thal, Styria a former Von Graben possession, between 1315 and 1605.

In 1574 the dynasty obtained Inkolat in Bohemia; later, however, several members converted to Lutheranism and lost their estates in the course of the Thirty Years' War. The Austrian diplomat Gottlieb of Windischgrätz (1630–1695) again converted to Roman Catholicism in 1682 and was elevated to the rank of Count of the Holy Roman Empire by Leopold I, Holy Roman Emperor, in the same year. In 1693 his son Ernest Frederick (1670–1727) acquired Červená Lhota Castle in Southern Bohemia, which his descendant Joseph Nicholas of Windisch-Graetz (1744–1802) had to sell in 1755.

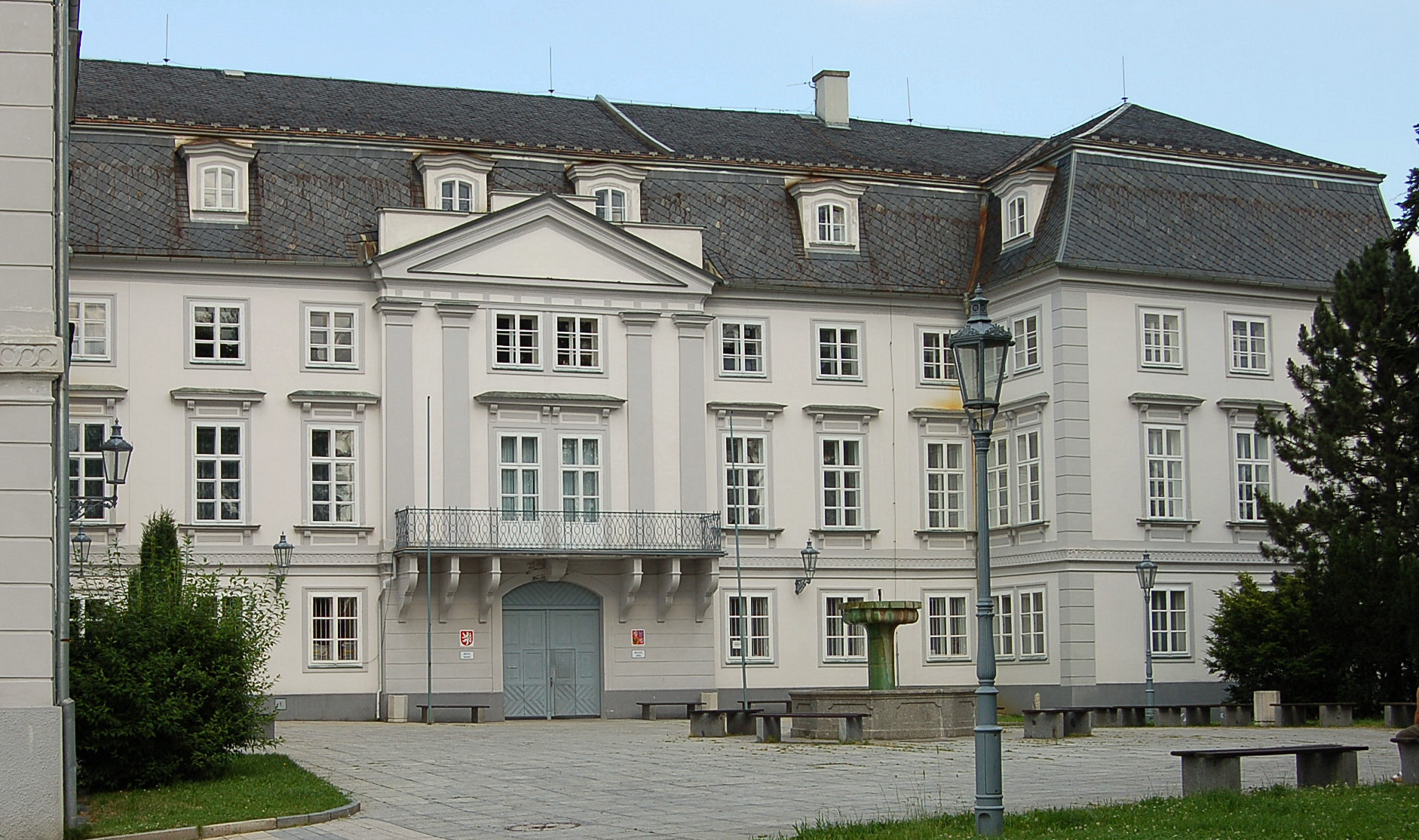
Tachov Palace, Western Bohemia

In 1781 the family bought their new main seat, the West Bohemian Tachov. Count Alfred Candidus Ferdinand zu Windischgrätz (1787–1862) became the representative of the emperor at the Reichstag and was elevated to the rank of Fürst (Prince of the Holy Roman Empire) in 1804. In order to obtain imperial immediacy (and be himself a voting member of the Imperial Diet), he acquired the small imperial territories of Siggen and Eglofs in Southern Germany. This principality however was mediatized to the Kingdom of Württemberg only two years later, in 1806, when the Confederation of the Rhine was established. Prince Alfred I later became a Field Marshal in the Austrian army.

Alfred and his brother Weriand were both created Princes of the Austrian Empire in 1822, with Alfred and his successors being the first line of Princes of Windischgrätz (primogenitur), and Weriand and his successors being the second line (secundogenitur). Alfred acquired the former monastery at Kladruby (Tachov District). His grandson Alfred III, Prince of Windischgrätz, was an influential politician. He was succeeded by his nephew Ludwig Aladar, the owner of Sárospatak Castle, Hungary.

Weriand, with the help of the rich dowry of his mother, Maria Leopoldine of Arenberg, acquired numerous castles in what is now Slovenia. After World War II, the estates in the Czechoslovak Republic as well as in Hungary and Yugoslavia were confiscated by communist regimes. The estate of Siggen is still owned by the elder line.

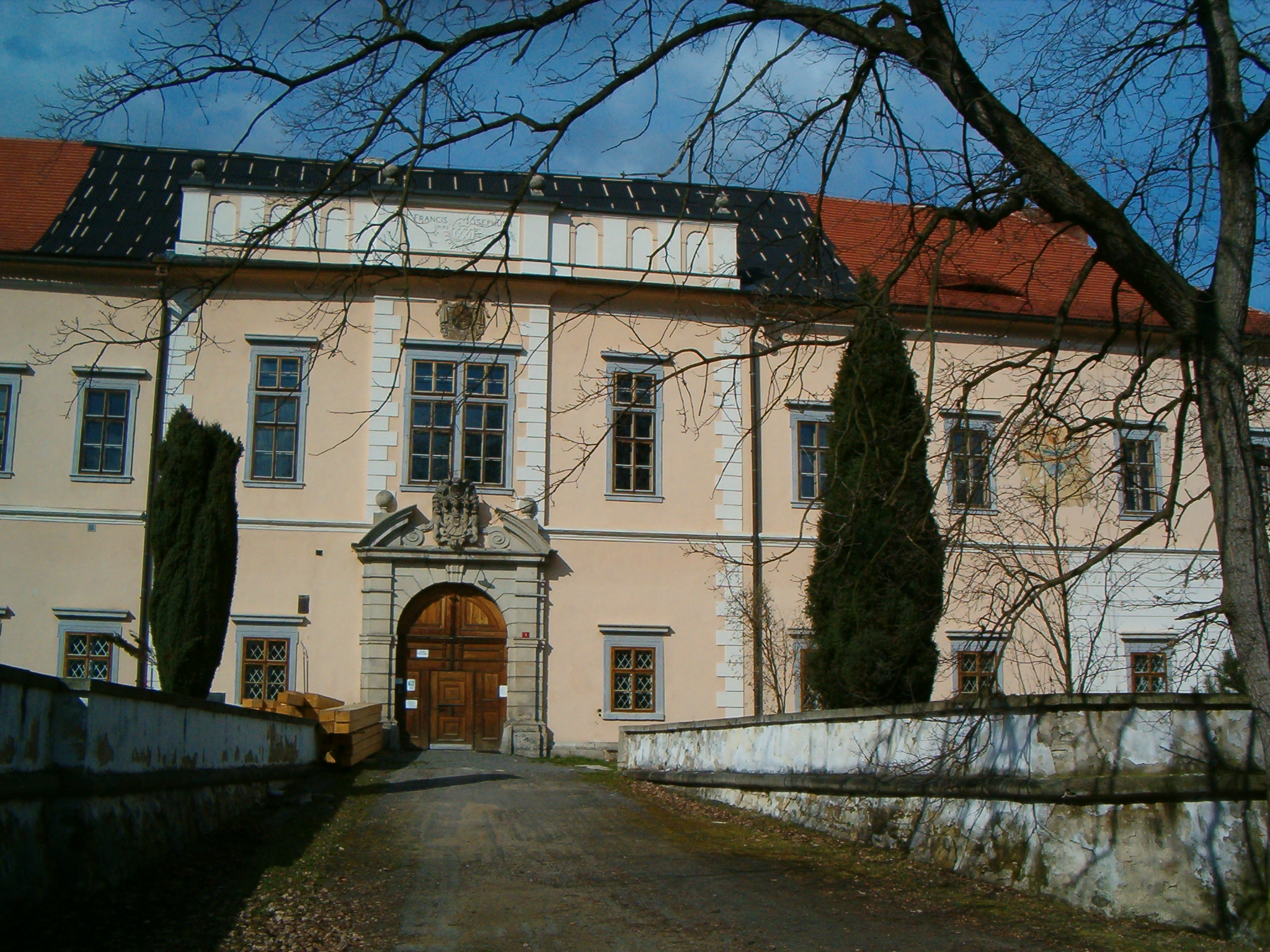
Štěkeň Castle

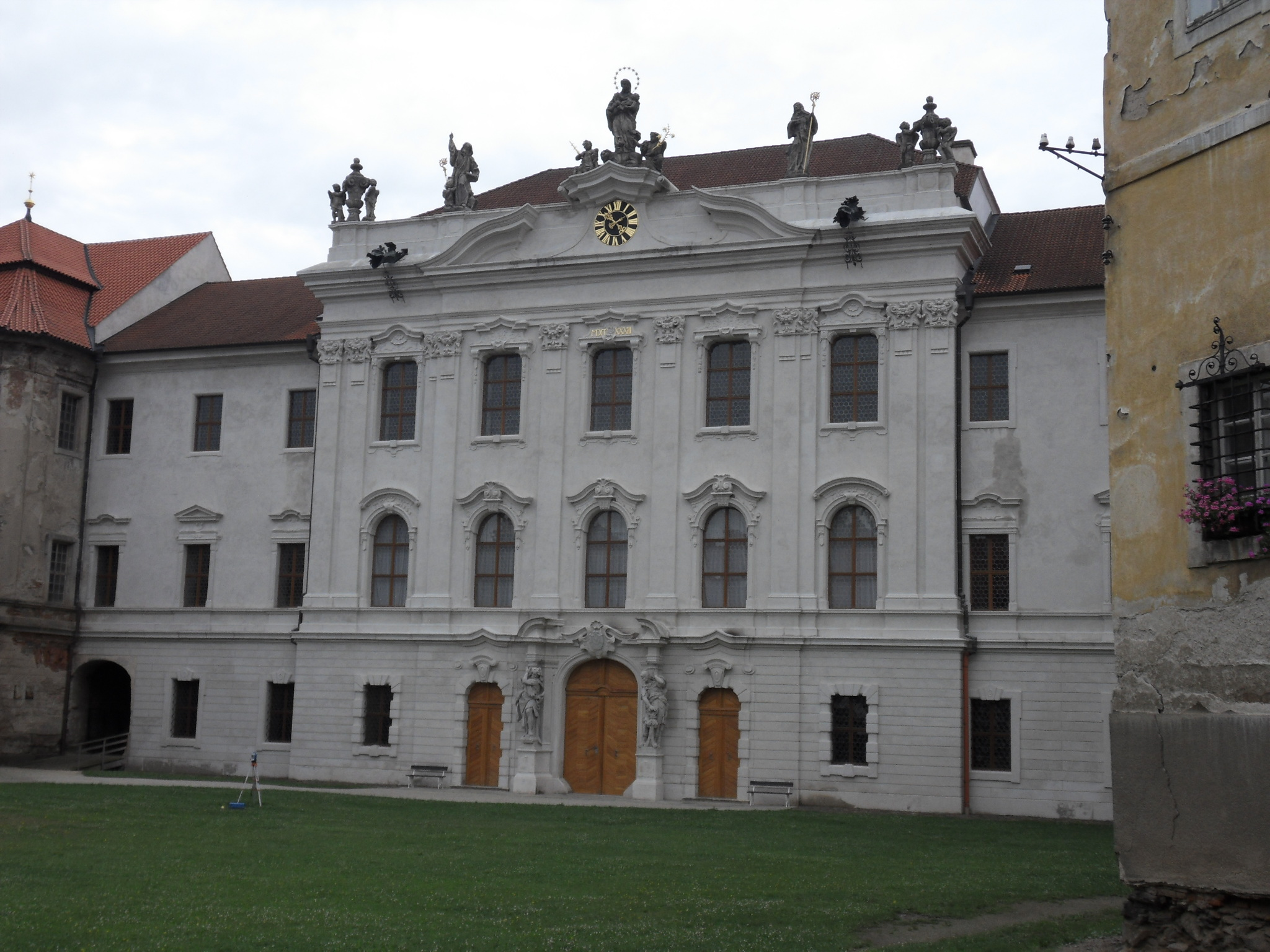
Kladruby Abbey

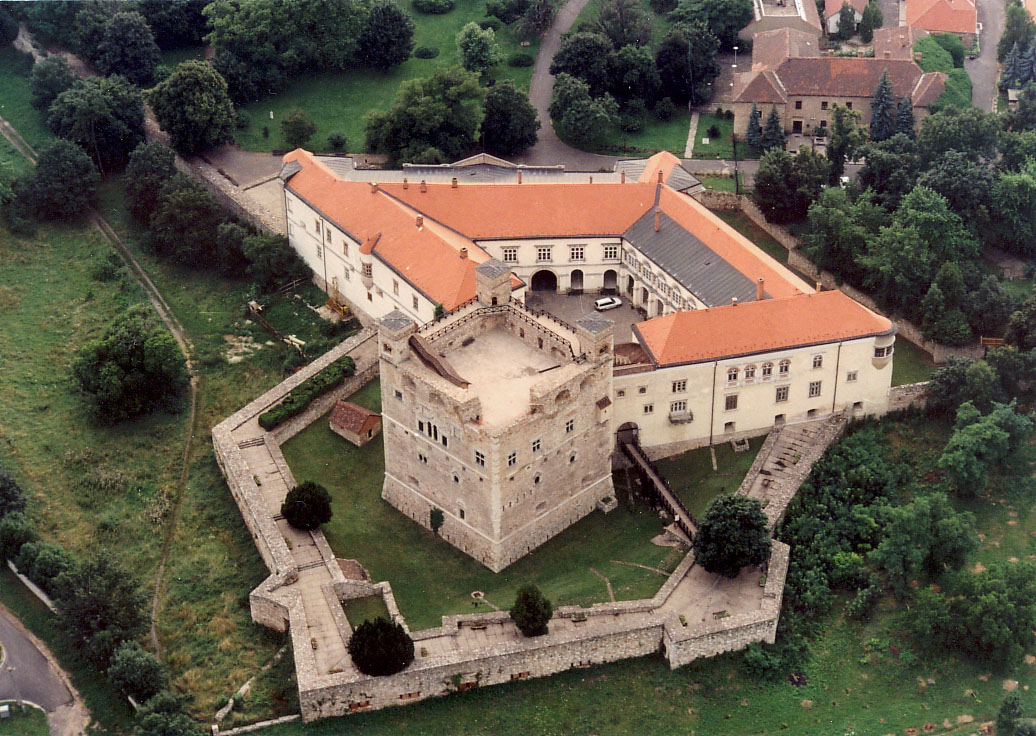
Sárospatak Castle, Hungary

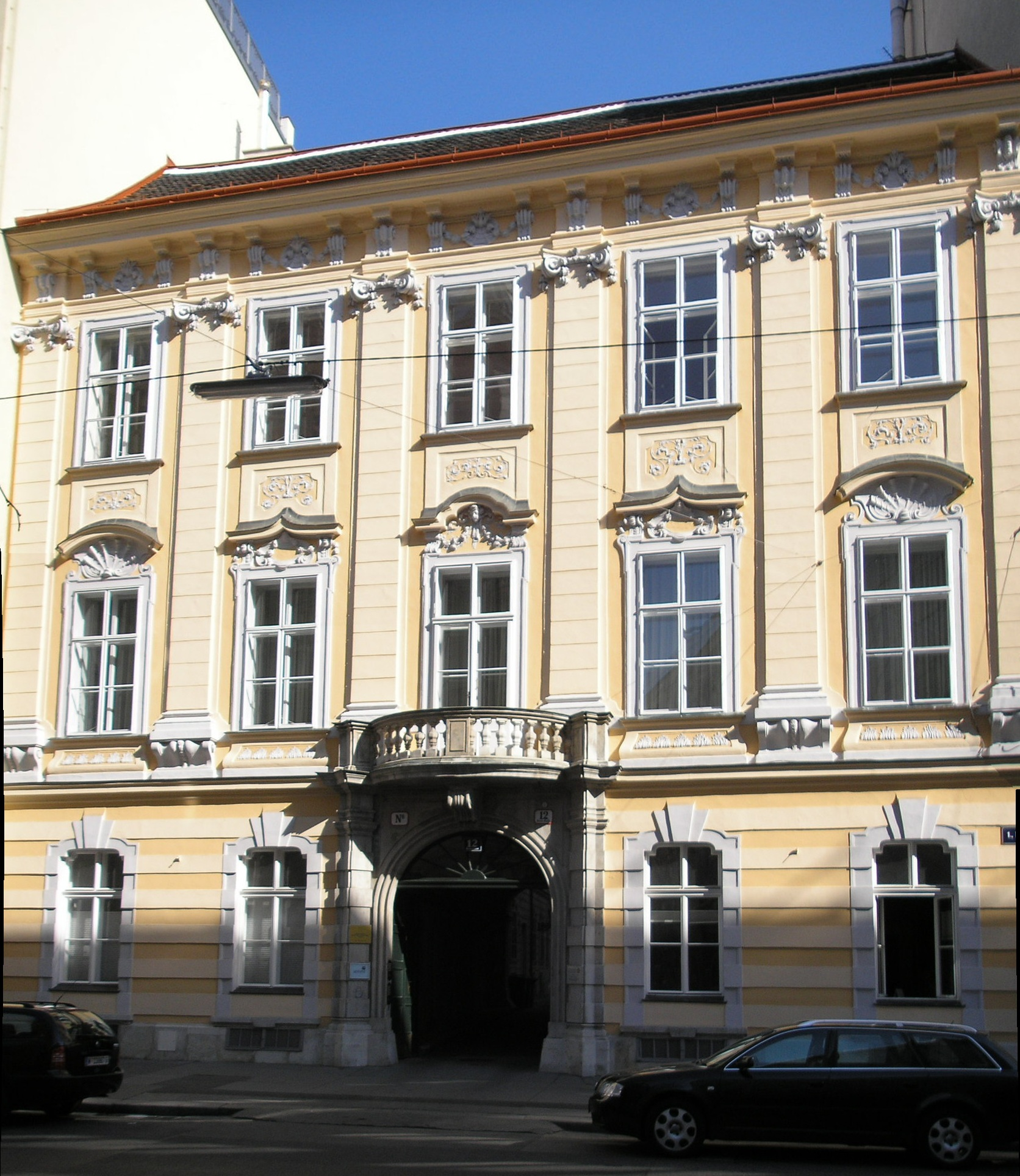
Palais Windisch-Graetz, Vienna

Great Britain's Princess Michael of Kent is descended from this family through her maternal grandmother, while her husband Prince Michael of Kent is a first cousin once removed of Archduchess Sophie Franziska of Austria, Princess of Windisch-Graetz.

== (Mediatized) Princes of Windischgrätz ==
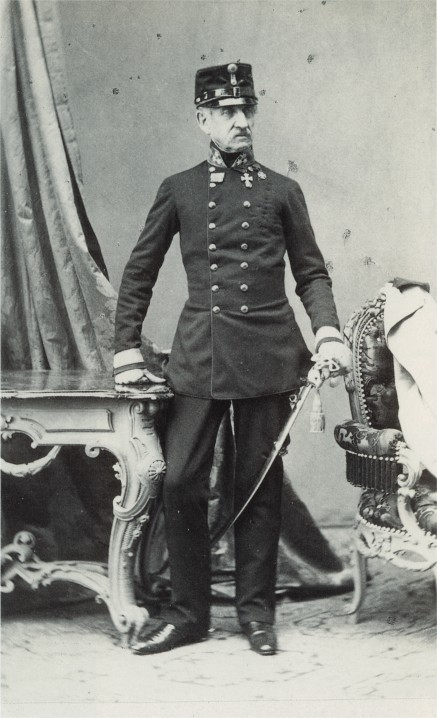
Alfred, 1st Prince of Windischgrätz (1787–1862)

Joseph Nicholas of Windischgrätz (1744–1802) was the father of both of the men whose lines are given below.

=== Elder Line ===
- Alfred I (1787–1862), Count 1802–1804, 1st Prince 1804–1862
  - Alfred II (1819–1876), 2nd Prince 1862–1876
    - Alfred III (1851–1927), 3rd Prince 1876–1927
  - Prince Ludwig (1830–1904)
    - Ludwig Alfred (1882–1968), 4th Prince 1927–1968; implicated in the Franc affair
      - Ludwig Aladar (1908–1990), 5th Prince 1968–1990
        - Prince Alfred (b. 1939) – renounced his succession rights in 1966
        - Anton (born 1942), 6th Prince 1990–present
  - Prince Joseph (1832–1906)
    - Prince Franz (1867–1947)
      - Prince Otto (1913–2011)
        - Prince Johann-Nepomuck (b. 1953)

=== Younger Line ===
- Weriand (1790–1867), 1st Prince 1822–1867
  - Hugo (1823–1904), 2nd Prince 1867–1904
    - Hugo (1854–1920), 3rd Prince 1904–1920
      - Hugo (1887–1959), 4th Prince 1920–1959
        - Maximilian (1914–1976), 5th Prince 1959–1976
          - Mariano Hugo (born 1955), 6th Prince 1976–present, married 1990 Archduchess Sophie Franziska of Austria
            - Maximilian Hugo, Hereditary Prince of Windisch-Graetz (b. 1990)
            - Prince Alexis Ferdinand (1991–2010)
            - Larissa Maria Grazia Helen Leontina Maria Luisa (b. 1996)
          - Prince Manfred (b. 1963)
            - Prince Nicolò (b. 1997)
            - Prince Brando (b. 2008)
      - Prince Alfred Weriand (1890–1972), married Princess Marie Isabella zu Hohenlohe-Langenburg
        - Christiane Anna
        - Gottfried Maximilian
        - Hugo Weriand Antonius Franziskus Thomas Maria, married Caroline Knott
          - Constantin Weriand Alfred Maria (b. 1962)
            - Leopold Weriand
            - Otto Atticus
          - Franz Karl Weriand Gottlieb Albrecht Maria (b. 1964)
            - Maximiliana Anastasia Christiane Isabella (b. 2004)
            - Augustin George Veriand Franziskus Ferdinand (b. 2006)
    - Princess Marie (1856–1929)
  - Ernst Ferdinand of Windisch-Graetz (1827–1918), married Princess Kamilla Amalia Caroline Notgera zu Oettingen-Spielberg
    - Karl Otto Hugo Weriand of Windisch-Graetz m. Countess Alexandra Festetics
    - Otto Weriand of Windisch-Grätz, married Archduchess Elisabeth Marie of Austria
    - Marie Gabriele of Windisch-Graetz

== Coat of arms ==
Gules, a wolf's head couped argent.

Original coat of arms of the family

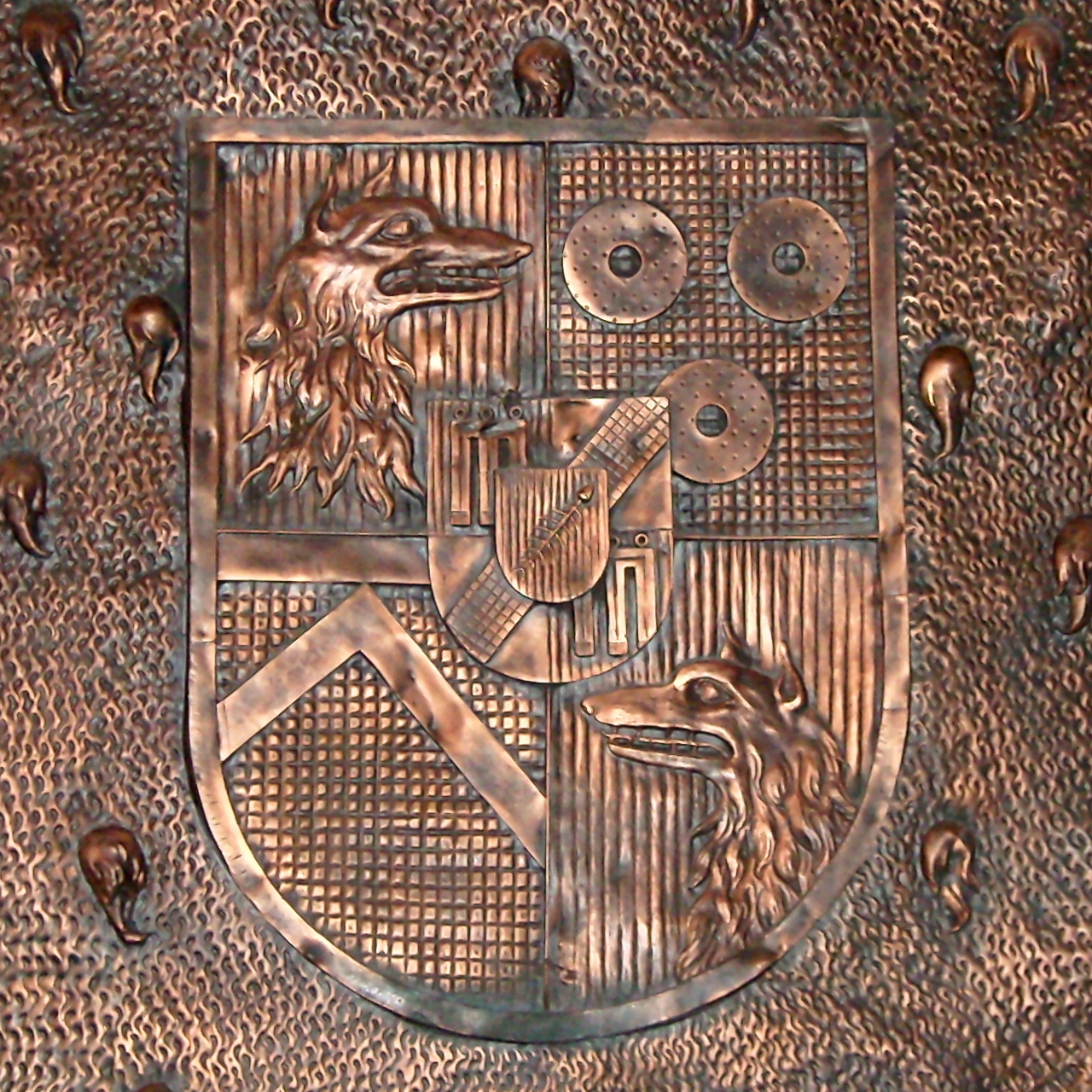

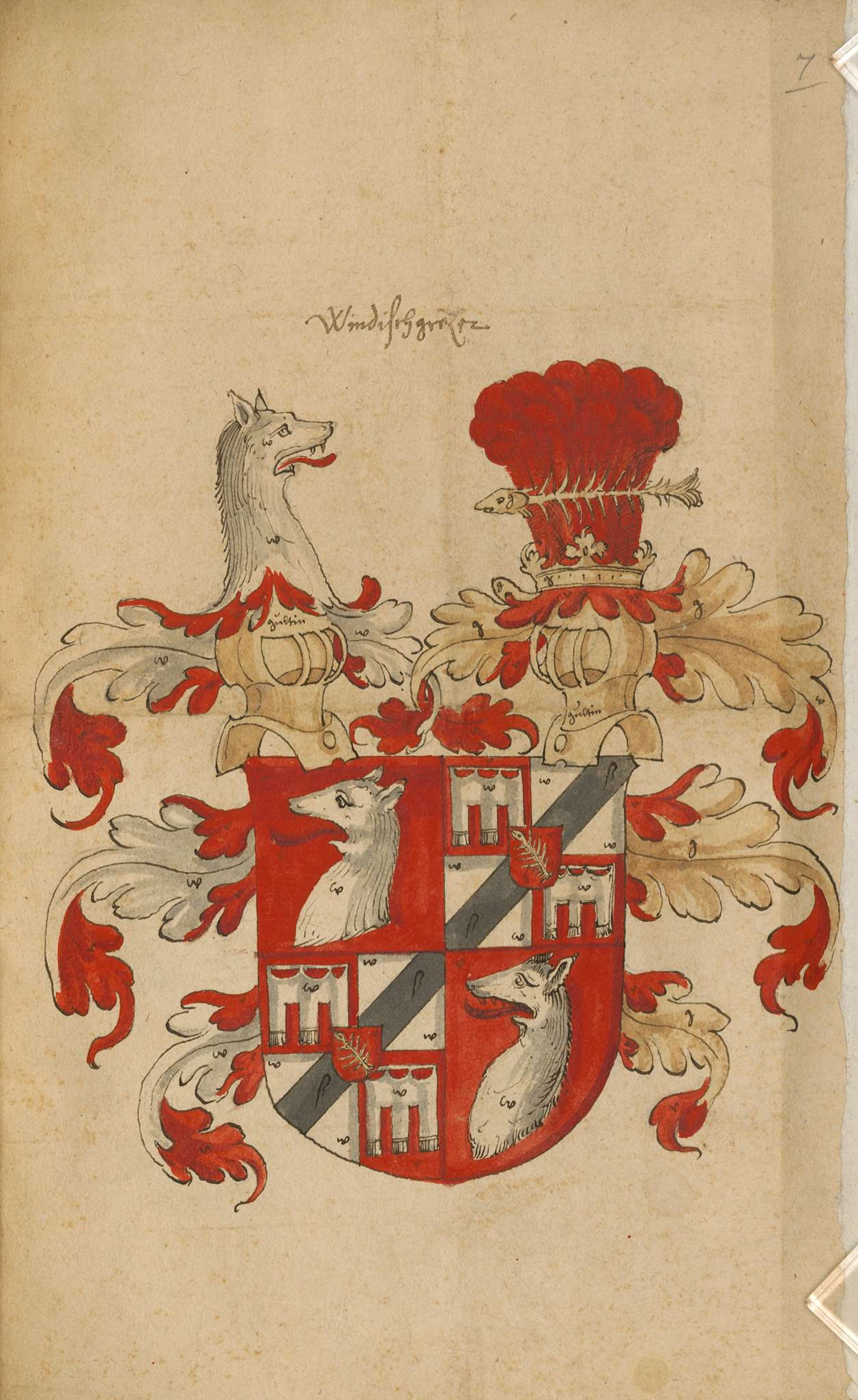

== Notable family members ==
- Joseph Nicholas of Windisch-Graetz (1744–1802), chamberlain of Marie Antoinette
- Alfred I, Prince of Windisch-Grätz (1787–1862), Austrian Field Marshal
- Alfred II, Prince of Windisch-Grätz (1819–1876), Austrian Feldmarschall-Lieutenant
- Alfred III, Prince of Windisch-Grätz (1851–1927), Austrian statesman
- Princess Marie of Windisch-Graetz (1856–1929), married Duke Paul Frederick of Mecklenburg in 1881
- Otto Weriand of Windisch-Graetz (1873–1952), married Archduchess Elisabeth Marie of Austria
- Princess Stephanie of Windisch-Graetz (1909–2005), daughter of Prince Otto Weriand of Windisch-Graetz
- Stéphanie Windisch-Graetz (b. 1939), daughter of Prince Franz Joseph of Windisch-Graetz (son of Prince Otto Weriand)
- Mariano Hugo, Prince of Windisch-Graetz (b. 1955), married Archduchess Sophie Franziska of Austria in 1990
- Prince Arnold zu Windischgrätz (1929–2007), Lutheran pastor
- Katalin zu Windisch-Graetz (b. 1947), Hungarian designer

== Former family estates in present-day Slovenia ==
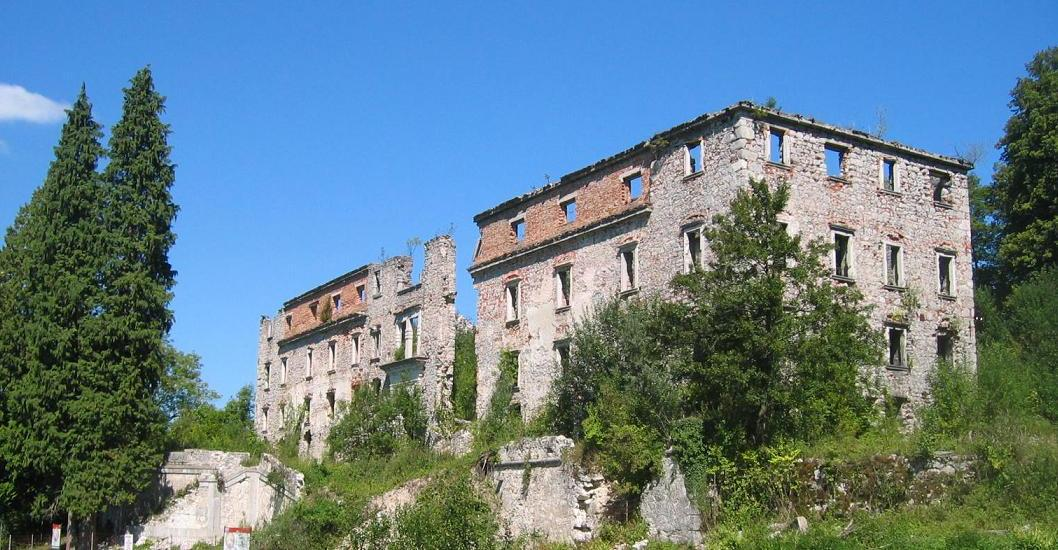
Haasberg Castle ruins

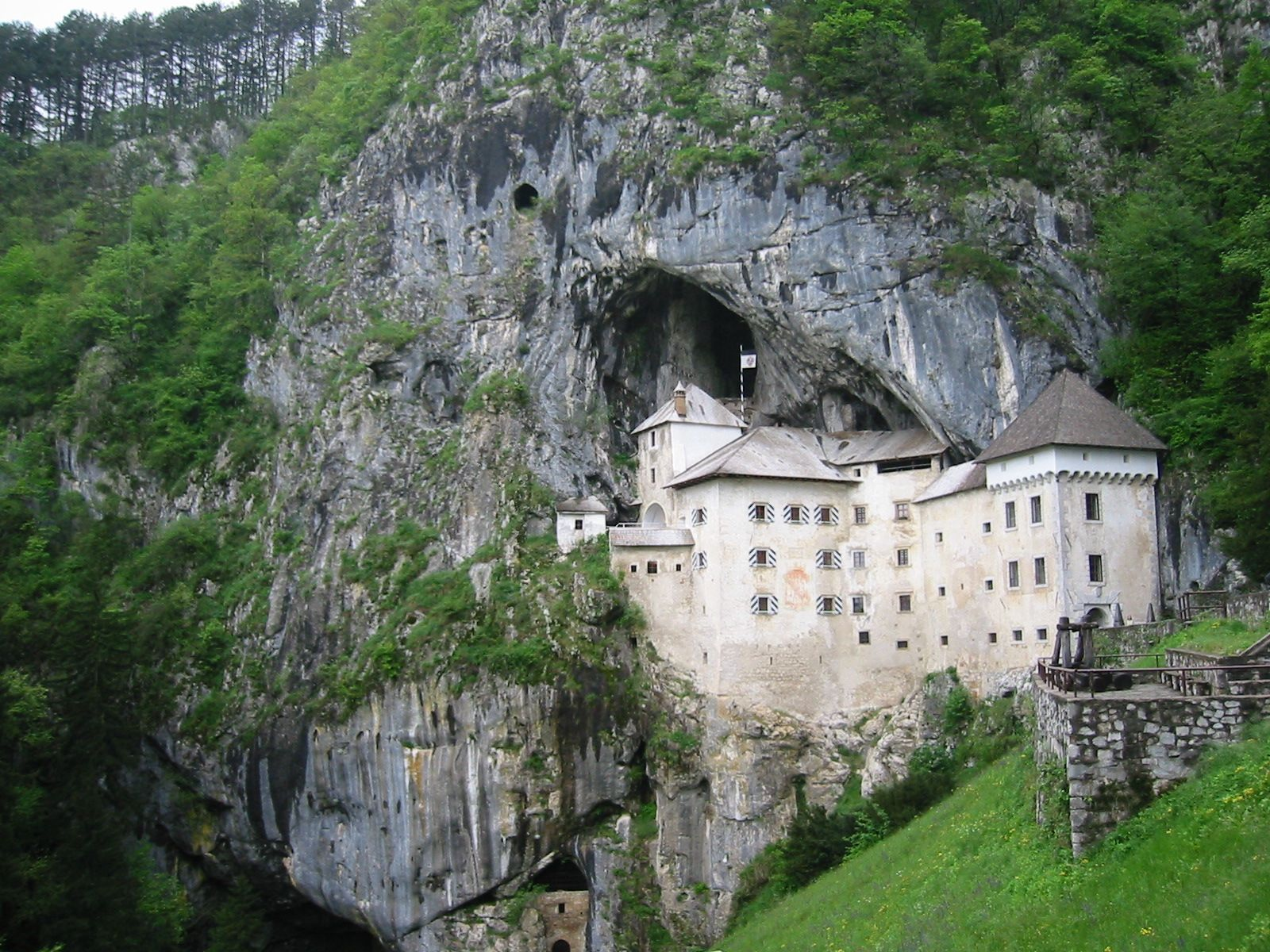
Luegg - Predjama Castle, Postojna

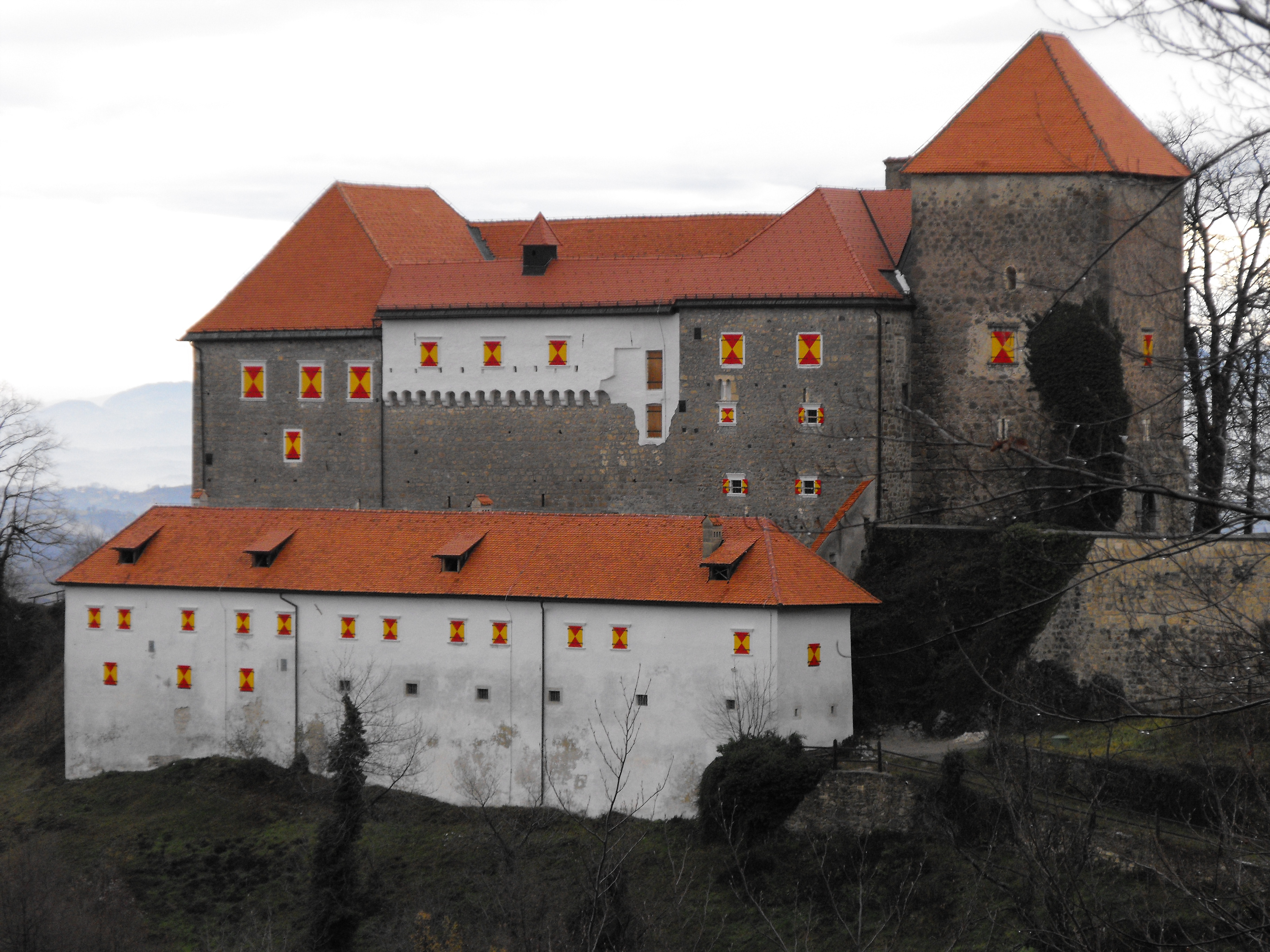
Podsreda Castle

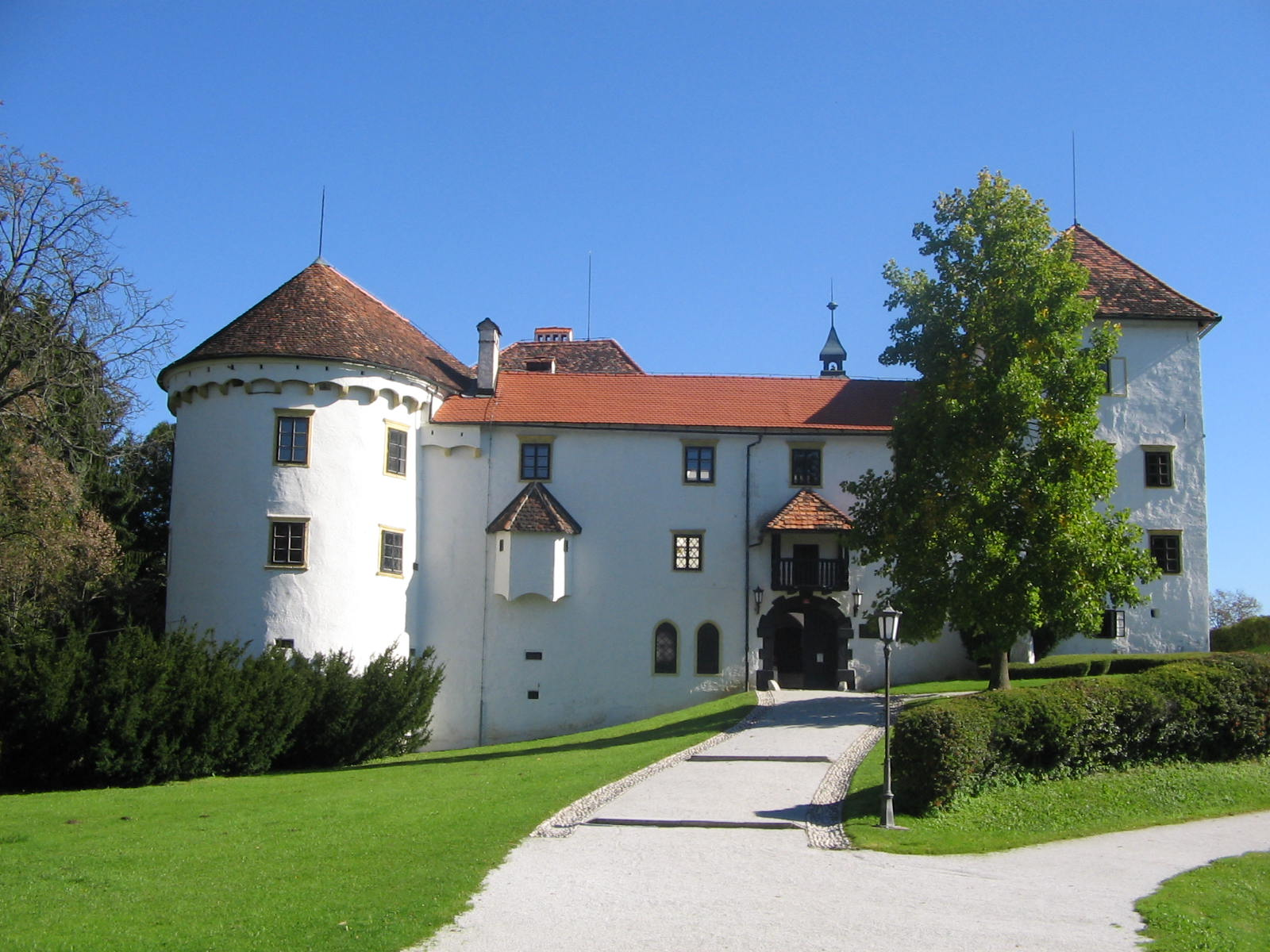
Bogenšperk Castle

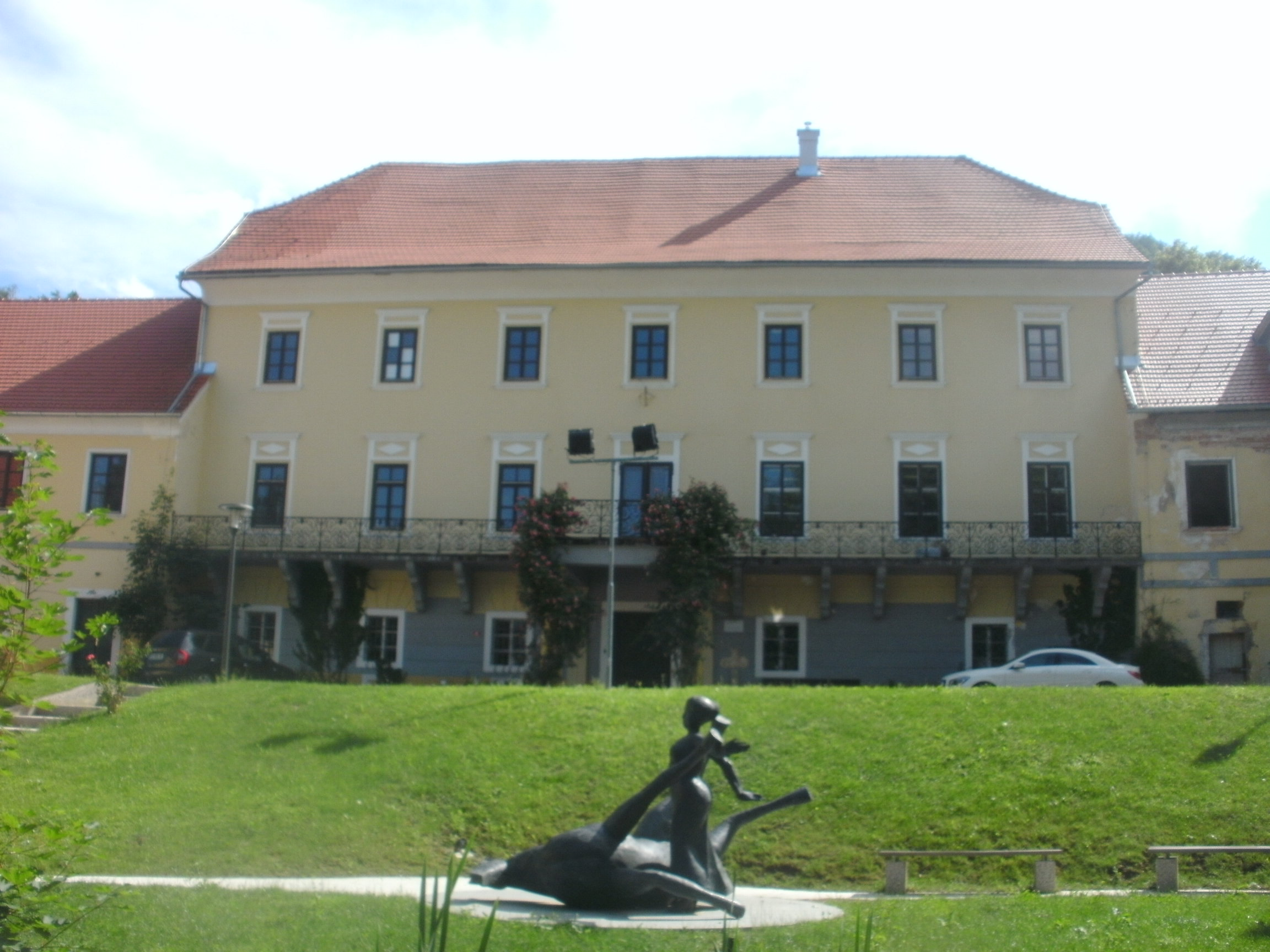
Trebnik Mansion, Slovenske Konjice

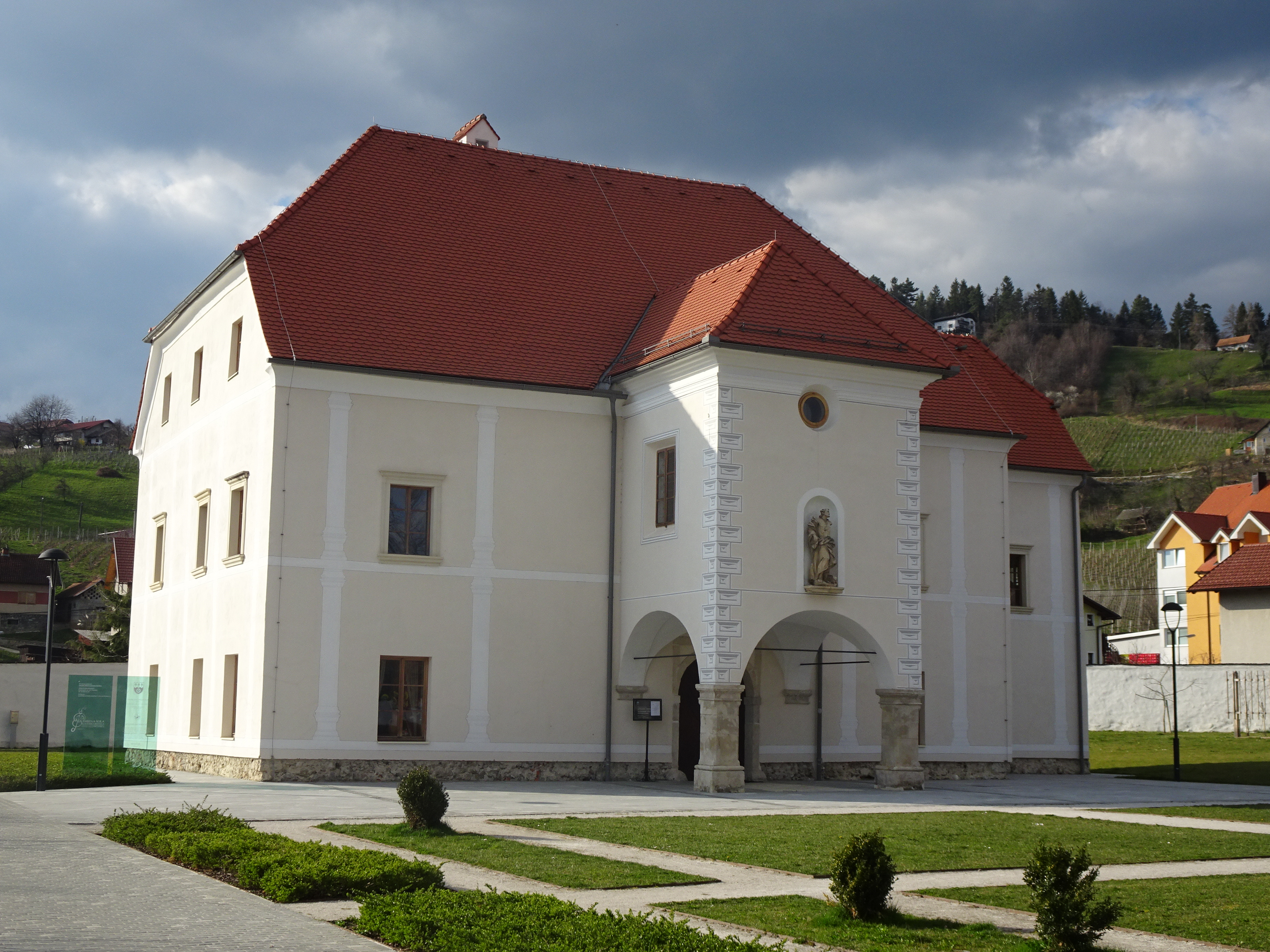
Oplotnica Mansion, Oplotnica

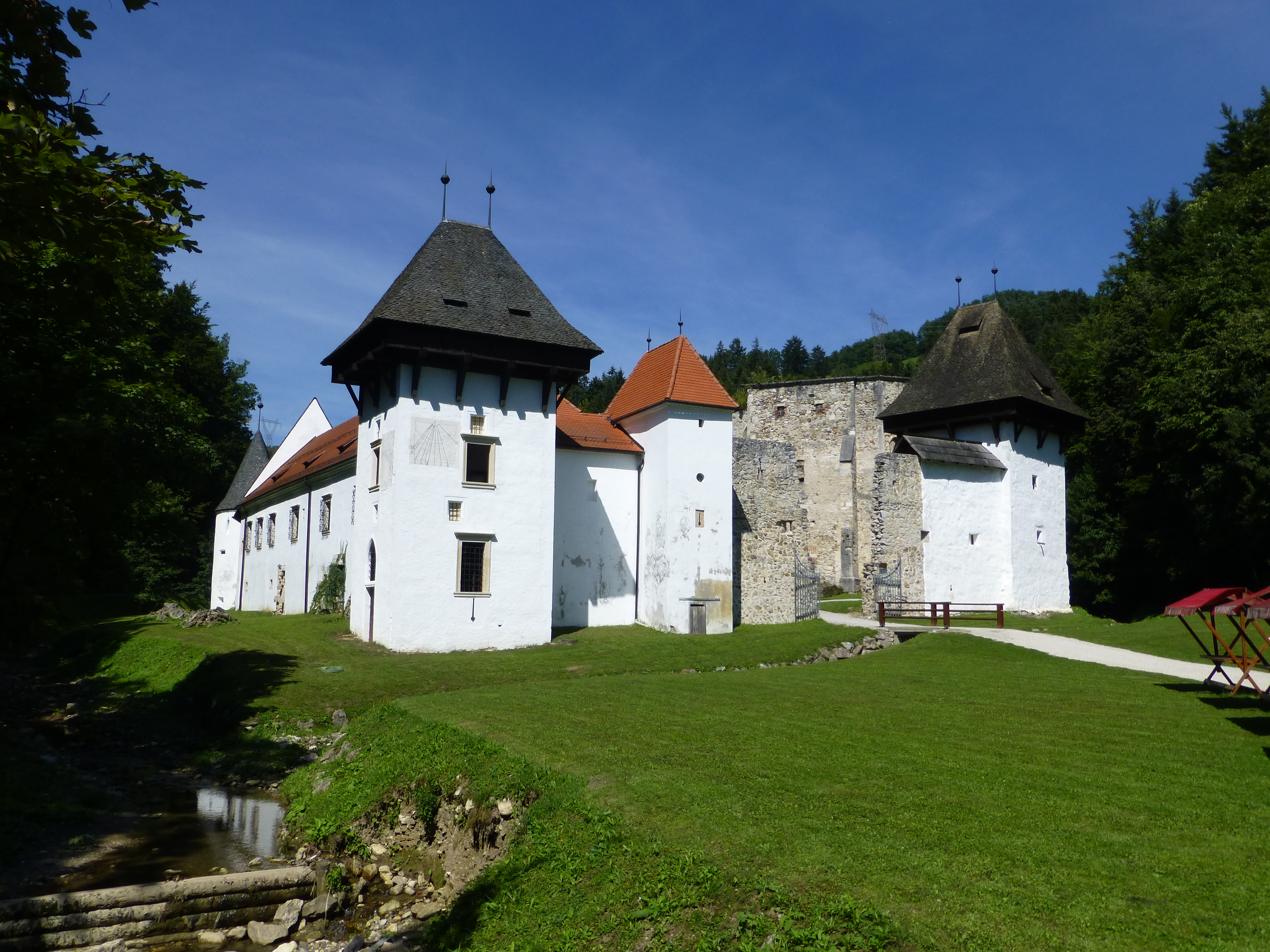
Žiče Charterhouse

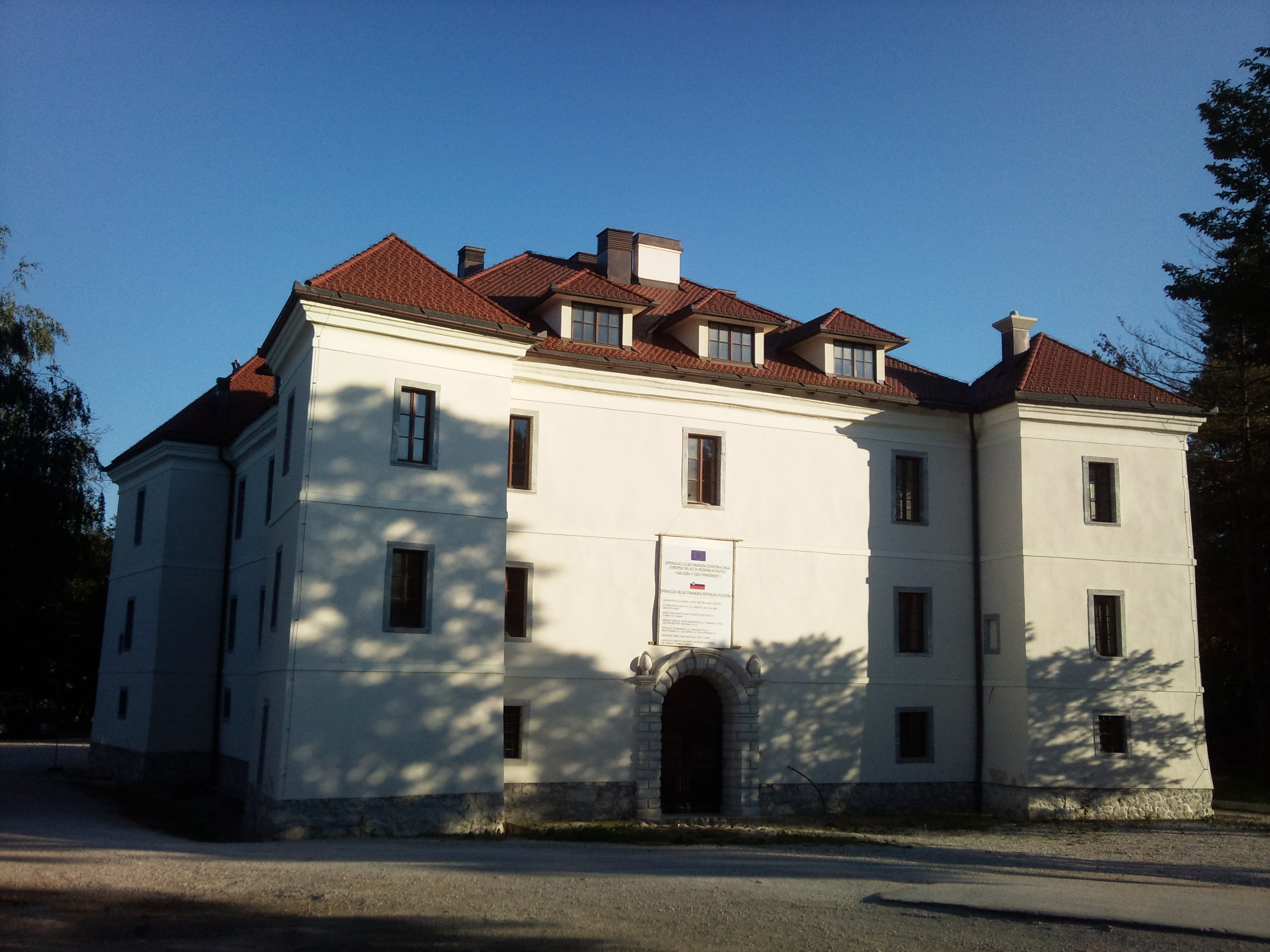
Logatec Mansion

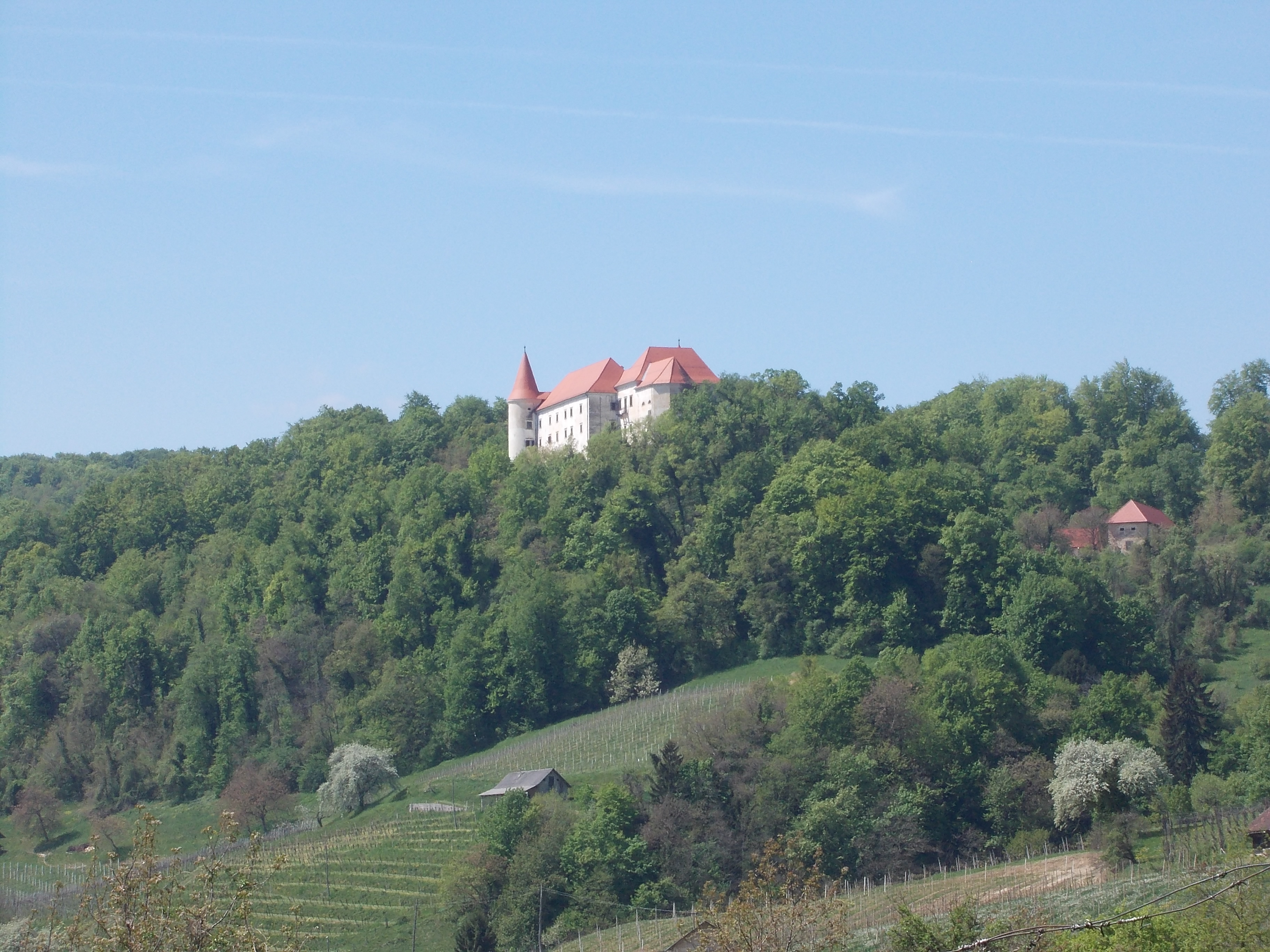
Bizeljsko Castle

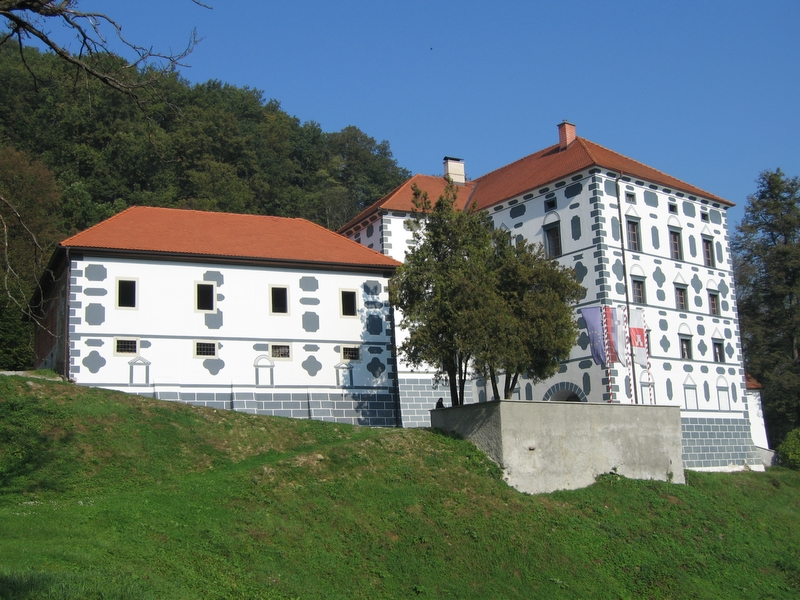
Strmol Mansion, Rogatec
