= Bizeljsko Castle =

Medieval castle in Slovenia

- grad Bizeljsko
- Bizeljska Vas, Municipality of Brežice, Slovenia
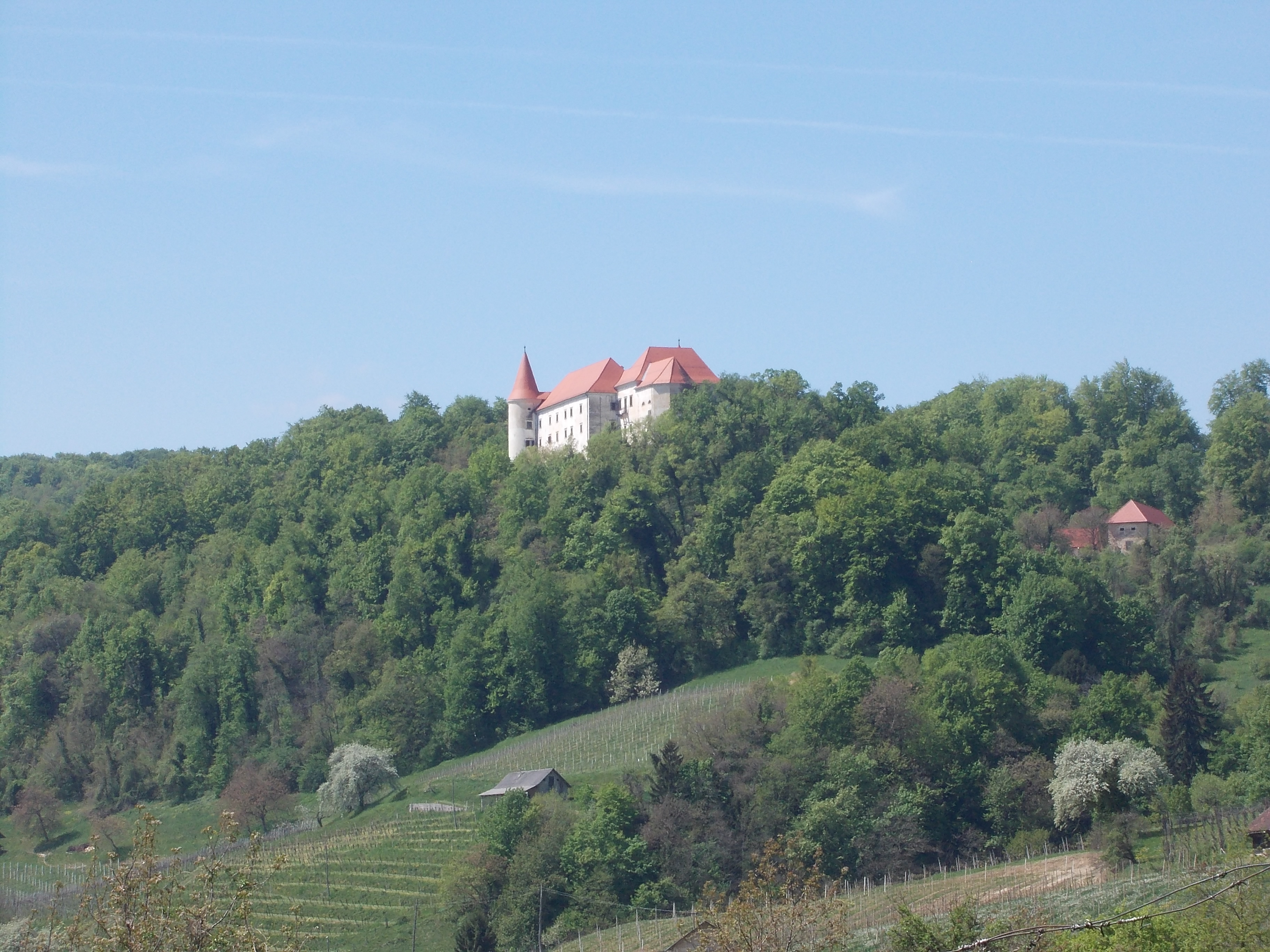

Location
- Location in Slovenia
- Coordinates: 46.0394°N 15.6942°E

Bizeljsko Castle (Slovene: grad Bizeljsko; grad Orešje, German: Schloss Wisell) is a castle in Bizeljska Vas, a village in the Municipality of Brežice, in southeastern Slovenia. It consists of a residential part that forms the centre of the complex and includes a Baroque chapel, as well as an outer part that served a defensive purpose.

The castle was mentioned for the first time in written sources in 1404. It has belonged to the families Tattenbach and Windisch-Graetz, among others. The oldest parts of the now-visible structure date from the 14th century, and the castle has been rebuilt and expanded gradually over the centuries.

== Gallery ==
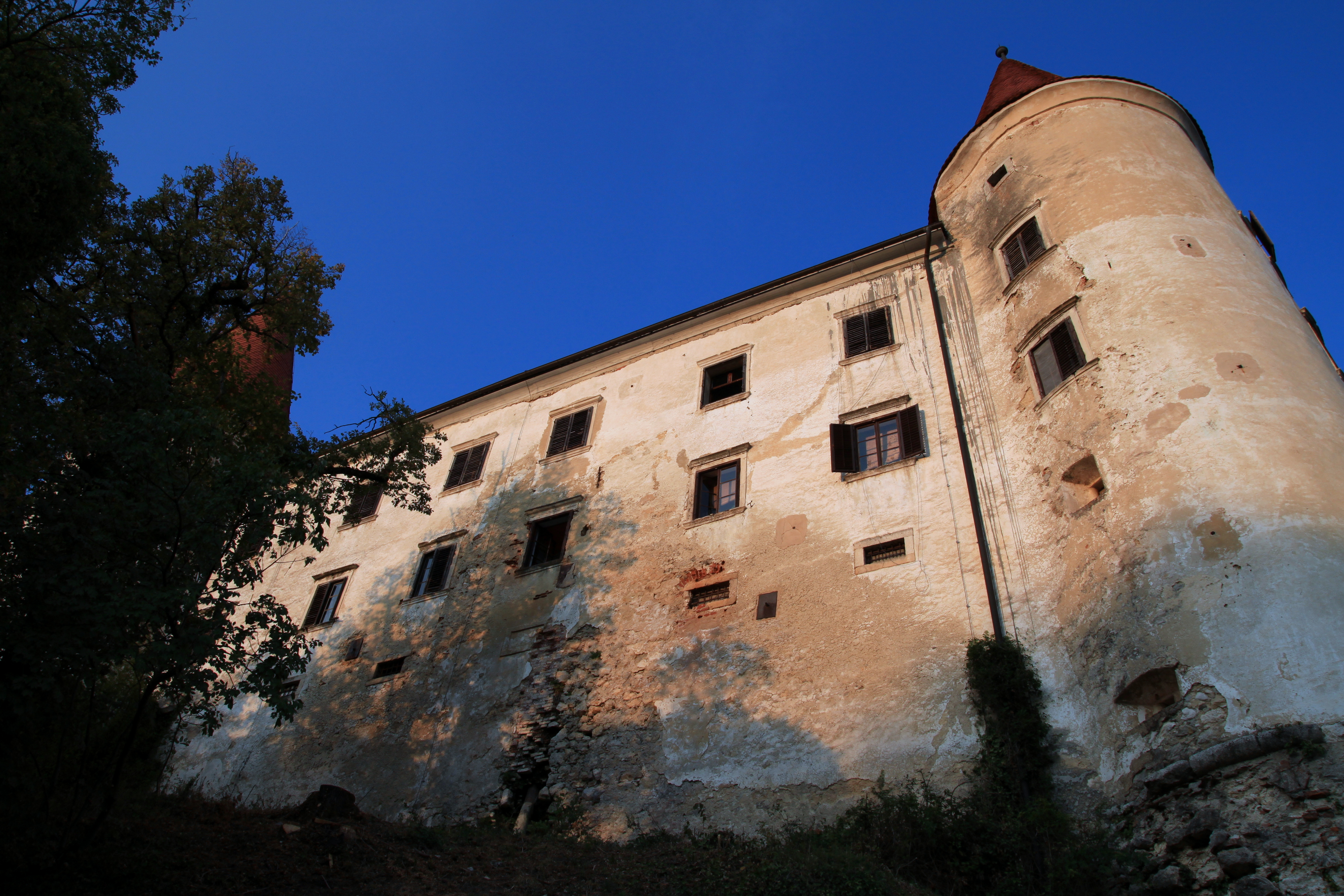

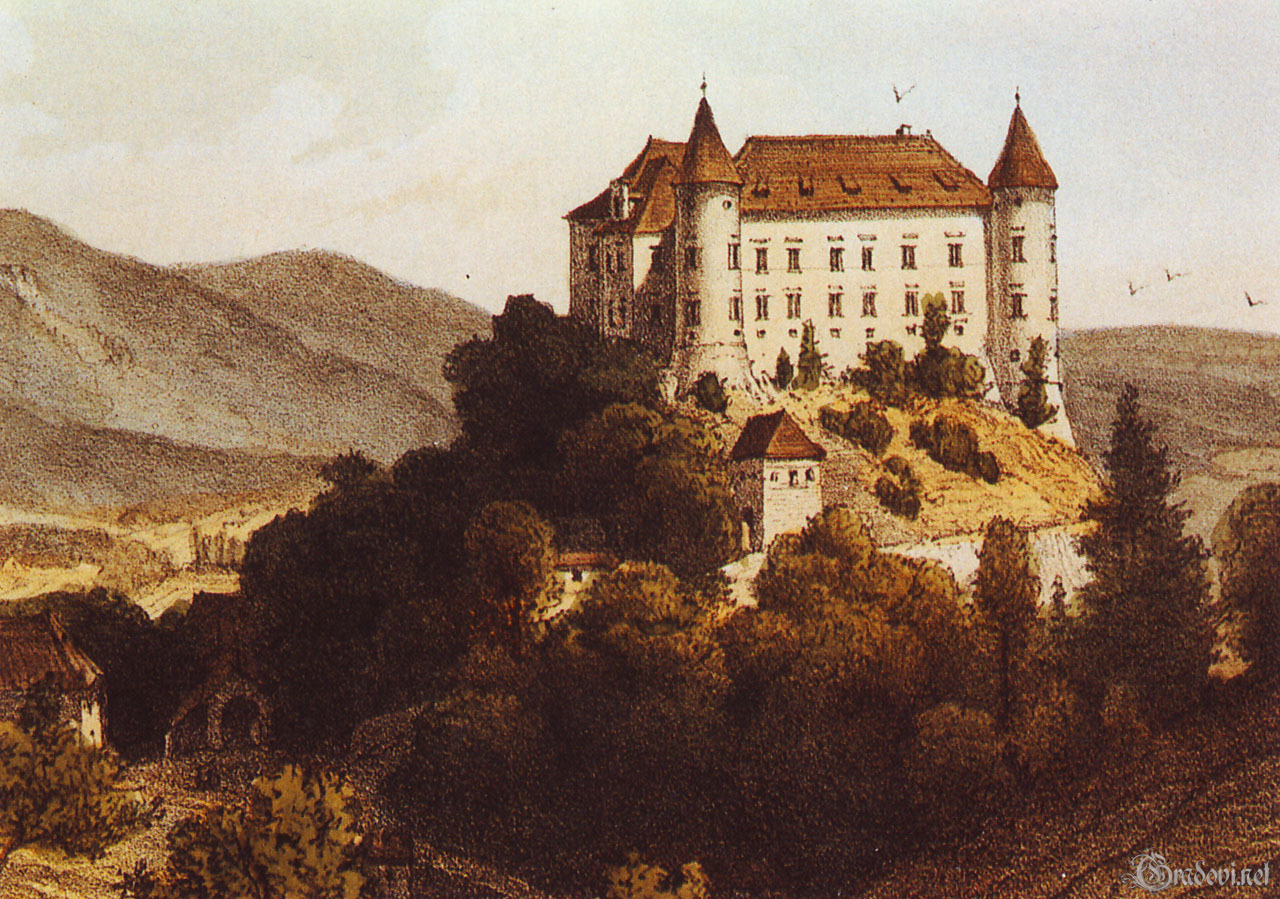
Historical image (1864)
