= Ploskovice =

- Municipality
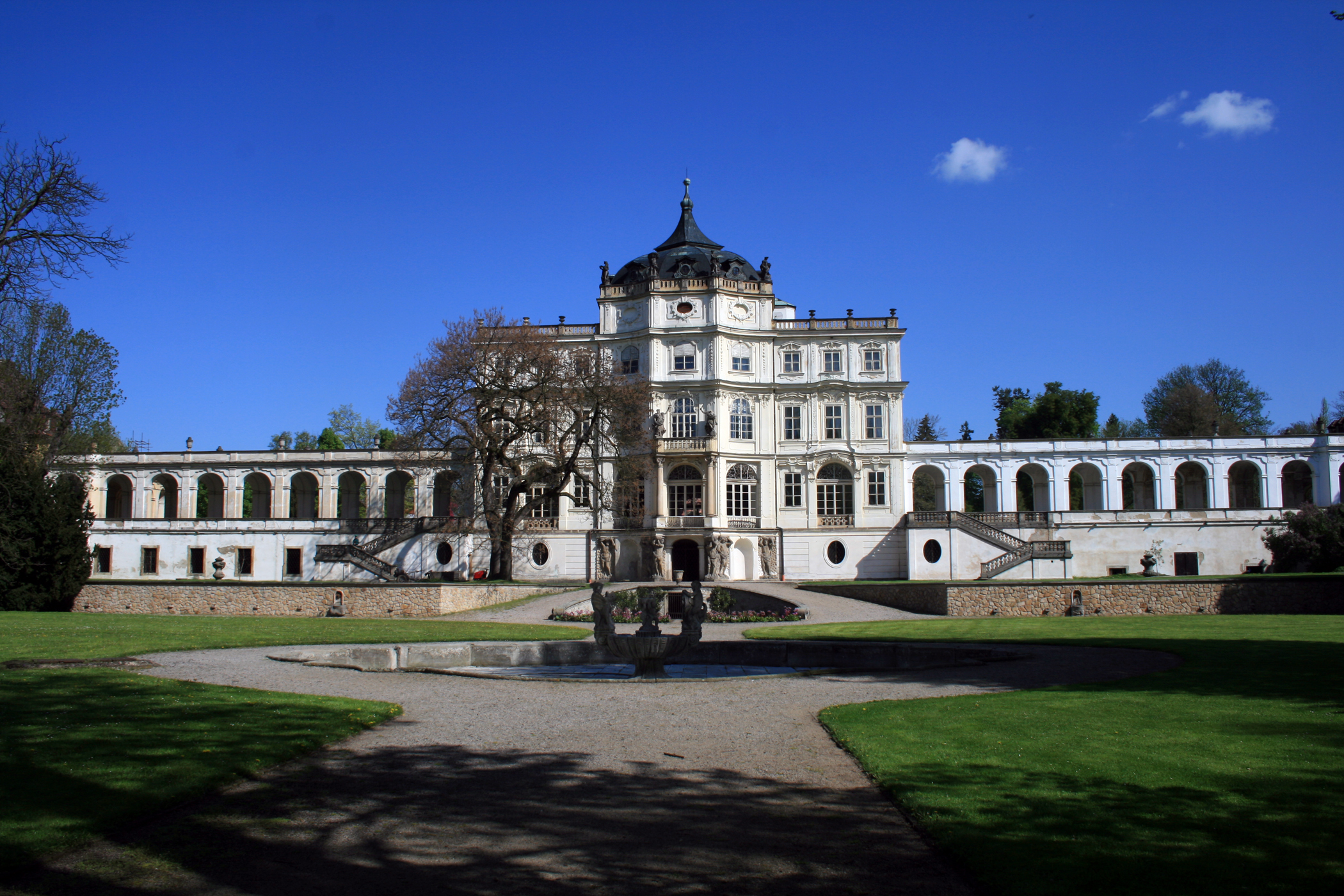
- Ploskovice Castle

- Flag Coat of arms

- Location in the Czech Republic
- Coordinates: 50°33′37″N 14°11′55″E
- Country: Czech Republic
- Region: Ústí nad Labem
- District: Litoměřice
- First mentioned: 1057

Area
  - Total: 8.42 km^{2} (3.25 sq mi)
- Elevation: 238 m (781 ft)

Population (2026-01-01)
  - Total: 475
  - Density: 56.4/km^{2} (146/sq mi)
- Time zone: UTC+1 (CET)
  - Summer (DST): UTC+2 (CEST)
- Postal codes: 411 42, 412 01
- Website: www.ploskovice.cz

Ploskovice (German: Ploschkowitz) is a municipality and village in Litoměřice District in the Ústí nad Labem Region of the Czech Republic. It has about 500 inhabitants. It is known for the Ploskovice Castle, which is protected as a national cultural monument.

== Administrative division ==
Ploskovice consists of five municipal parts (in brackets population according to the 2021 census):

- Ploskovice (313)
- Maškovice (34)
- Starý Mlýnec (30)
- Těchobuzice (67)
- Vinné (19)

== Etymology ==
The name is derived from the personal name Ploska, meaning "the village of Ploska's people".

== Geography ==
Ploskovice is located about 5 kilometres (3 mi) northeast of Litoměřice and 16 km (10 mi) southeast of Ústí nad Labem. It lies mostly in the Ralsko Uplands, only the northern part extends into the Central Bohemian Uplands. The highest point is on the slopes of the hill Trojhora at 375 m (1,230 ft) above sea level. Almost the whole municipality lies within the České středohoří Protected Landscape Area.

== History ==
The first written mention of Ploskovice is in a foundation deed of the Litoměřice Chapter from 1057. In 1188, the village was owned by the nobleman Hroznata of Ovenec, who donated it to the Knights Hospitaller. They had here a commandery until the Hussite Wars. In 1436, King Sigismund handed over Ploskovice to Jakoubek of Vřesovice. He and his descendants fortified the formed commandery and made it an aristocratic residence.

After the uprising of the serfs in 1496, the village fell into the hands of the knight Dalibor of Kozojedy, but he was executed soon after. Dalibor's fate inspired Bedřich Smetana to write the opera Dalibor. In the 16th century, Ploskovice often changed owners. In 1545–1575, the original manor house was rebuilt into a castle. During the Thirty Years' War, Ploskovice was burned several times.

In 1663, Ploskovice was acquired by Dukes of Saxe-Lauenburg. After the death of Duke Julius Francis, Ploskovice was ruled by Duchess Anna Maria Franziska. She had demolish the old castle and had built a new one in 1720–1725. The next owner of Ploskovice was Maximilian III Joseph, Elector of Bavaria. His properties in Bohemia were handed over to Ferdinand III, Grand Duke of Tuscany in 1813, who had expanded the castle. In 1835, Ploskovice became a property of Ferdinand I of Austria. Ploskovice developed after 1848, when the castle became Ferdinand's summer residence.

== Demographics ==
Historical population

Year	Pop.	±%
1869	755	—
1880	828	+9.7%
1890	807	−2.5%
1900	826	+2.4%
1910	922	+11.6%

Year	Pop.	±%
1921	908	−1.5%
1930	918	+1.1%
1950	591	−35.6%
1961	655	+10.8%
1970	538	−17.9%

Year	Pop.	±%
1980	457	−15.1%
1991	377	−17.5%
2001	348	−7.7%
2011	417	+19.8%
2021	463	+11.0%

Source: Censuses

== Transport ==
The I/15 road (the section from Česká Lípa to Litoměřice) runs through the southern part of the municipality.

The railway line Česká Lípa–Postoloprty also passes through this part of municipality. However, the train station called Ploskovice is located just outside the municipality.

== Sights ==
The most important landmark is the Ploskovice Castle, which is protected as a national cultural monument. The castle was built in the Baroque style in 1720–1730, probably according to the design by Kilian Ignaz Dientzenhofer, and rebuilt in the Romantic style in 1850–1853. The interior was decorated by the painter Josef Matěj Navrátil in the Rococo Revival style. The castle has been a tourist destination since 1945 and offers guided tours. Next to the castle is a castle park with a pond, fountains, and rare plants.
