= Duchess Luise of Mecklenburg-Schwerin =

Princess of Windisch-Graetz from 1849 to 1859

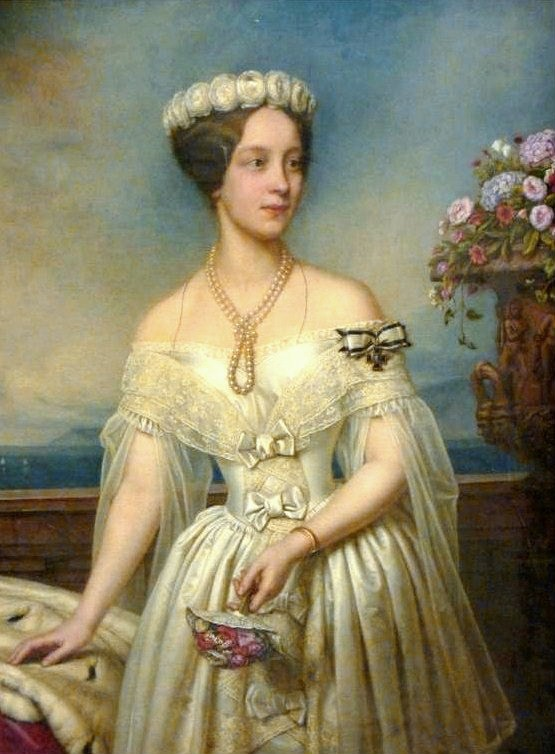
- Portrait of Luise, by Joseph Karl Stieler, 1849
- Born: 17 May 1824; Ludwigslust Palace, Mecklenburg
- Died: 9 March 1859 (aged 34)
- Spouse: Hugo, 2nd Prince of Windisch-Graetz (m. 1849)
- Issue: Princess Alexandra of Windisch-Graetz; Princess Olga of Windisch-Graetz; Hugo, 3rd Prince of Windisch-Graetz; Princess Marie of Windisch-Graetz
- House: Mecklenburg-Schwerin
- Father: Paul Frederick, Grand Duke of Mecklenburg-Schwerin
- Mother: Alexandrine of Prussia

Luise Marie Helene, Hereditary Princess of Windisch-Graetz (née Duchess Luise Marie Helene of Mecklenburg-Schwerin; 17 May 1824 – 9 March 1859) was a member of the Grand Ducal House of Mecklenburg-Schwerin and by marriage Princess of Windisch-Graetz.

== Early life ==
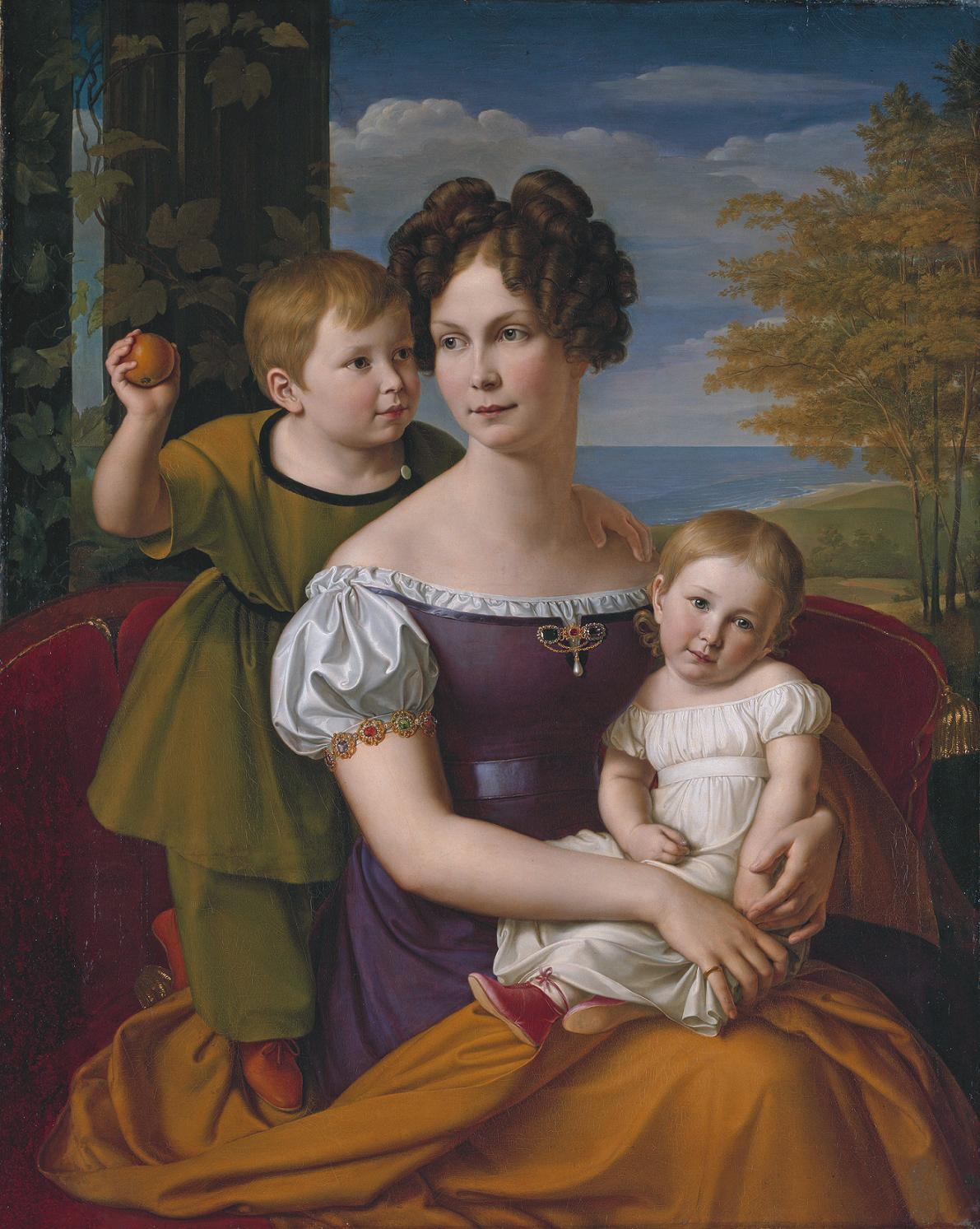
Portrait of Luise as a child with her mother, Grand Duchess Alexandrine, and her brother, Friedrich Franz, by Friedrich Wilhelm Schadow, 1825

Luise was born on 17 May 1824 at Ludwigslust Palace. She was the second child, and only daughter, of Paul Frederick, Grand Duke of Mecklenburg-Schwerin and Princess Alexandrine of Prussia (1803–1892). She was named after her grandmother, Queen Luise. Her brothers were Frederick Francis II, Grand Duke of Mecklenburg-Schwerin and Duke William of Mecklenburg-Schwerin (who married their cousin, Princess Alexandrine of Prussia, daughter of Prince Albert of Prussia).

Her paternal grandparents were Friedrich Ludwig, Hereditary Grand Duke of Mecklenburg-Schwerin and Grand Duchess Elena Pavlovna of Russia. Her aunt, Marie of Mecklenburg-Schwerin, married Georg, Duke of Saxe-Altenburg. After her grandmother's death in 1803, her grandfather married Princess Caroline Louise of Saxe-Weimar-Eisenach (daughter of Charles Augustus, Grand Duke of Saxe-Weimar-Eisenach), with whom he had another child, Luise's aunt, Hélène of Mecklenburg-Schwerin, who married Prince Ferdinand Philippe, Duke of Orléans (eldest son of King Louis Philippe I of France). After Princess Caroline died in 1816, her grandfather married, for the third and final time, to Princess Caroline's first cousin, Landgravine Auguste of Hesse-Homburg, who raised Luise's father and siblings. Her maternal grandparents were King Frederick William III of Prussia and the much beloved Duchess Louise of Mecklenburg-Strelitz. She was awarded the Order of Louise, founded on 3 August 1814 by her grandfather to honor his late wife, Queen Louise. The order was chivalric in nature, but was intended strictly for women whose service to Prussia was worthy of such high national recognition.

== Personal life ==
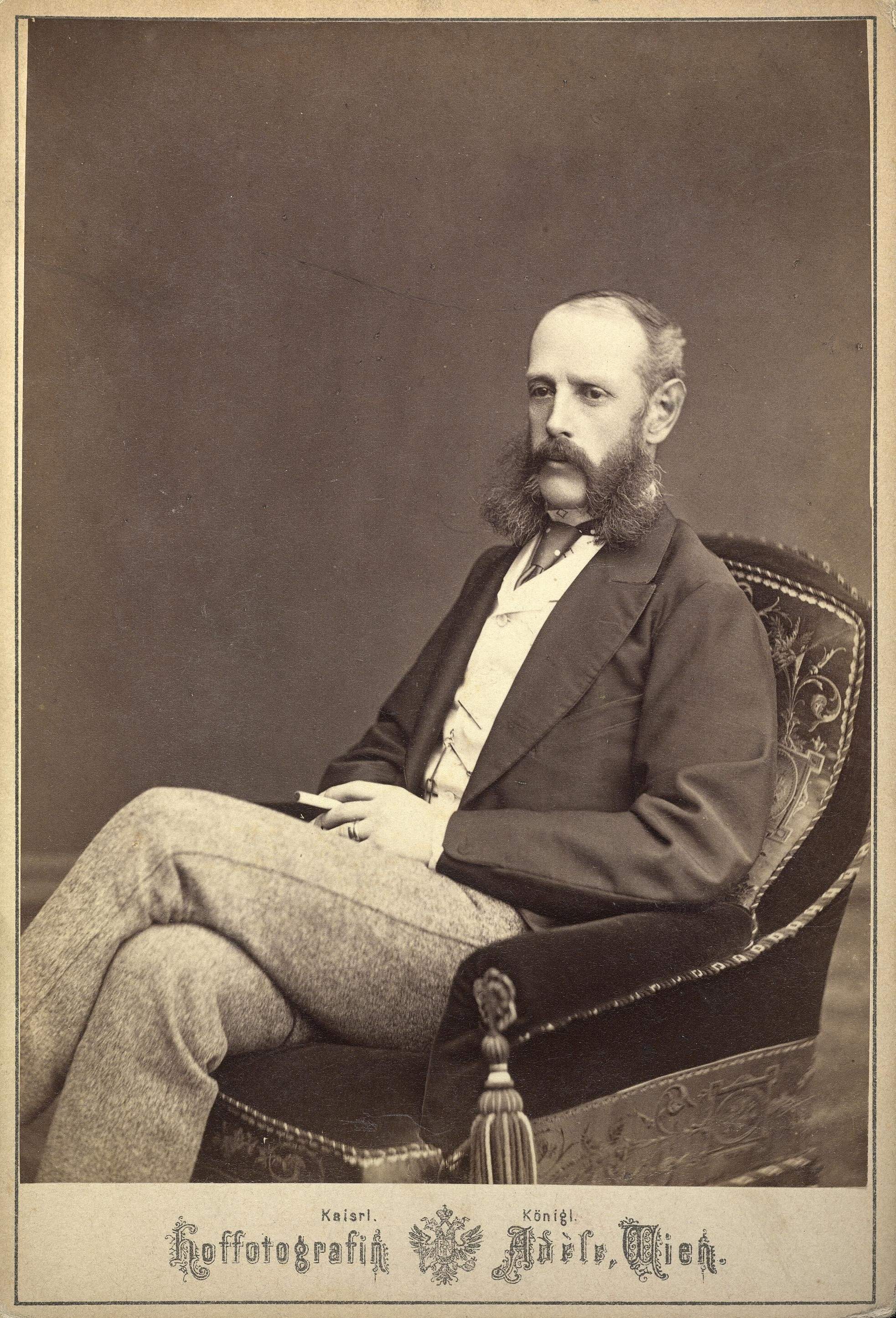
Photograph of Prince Hugo, by Atelier Adèle

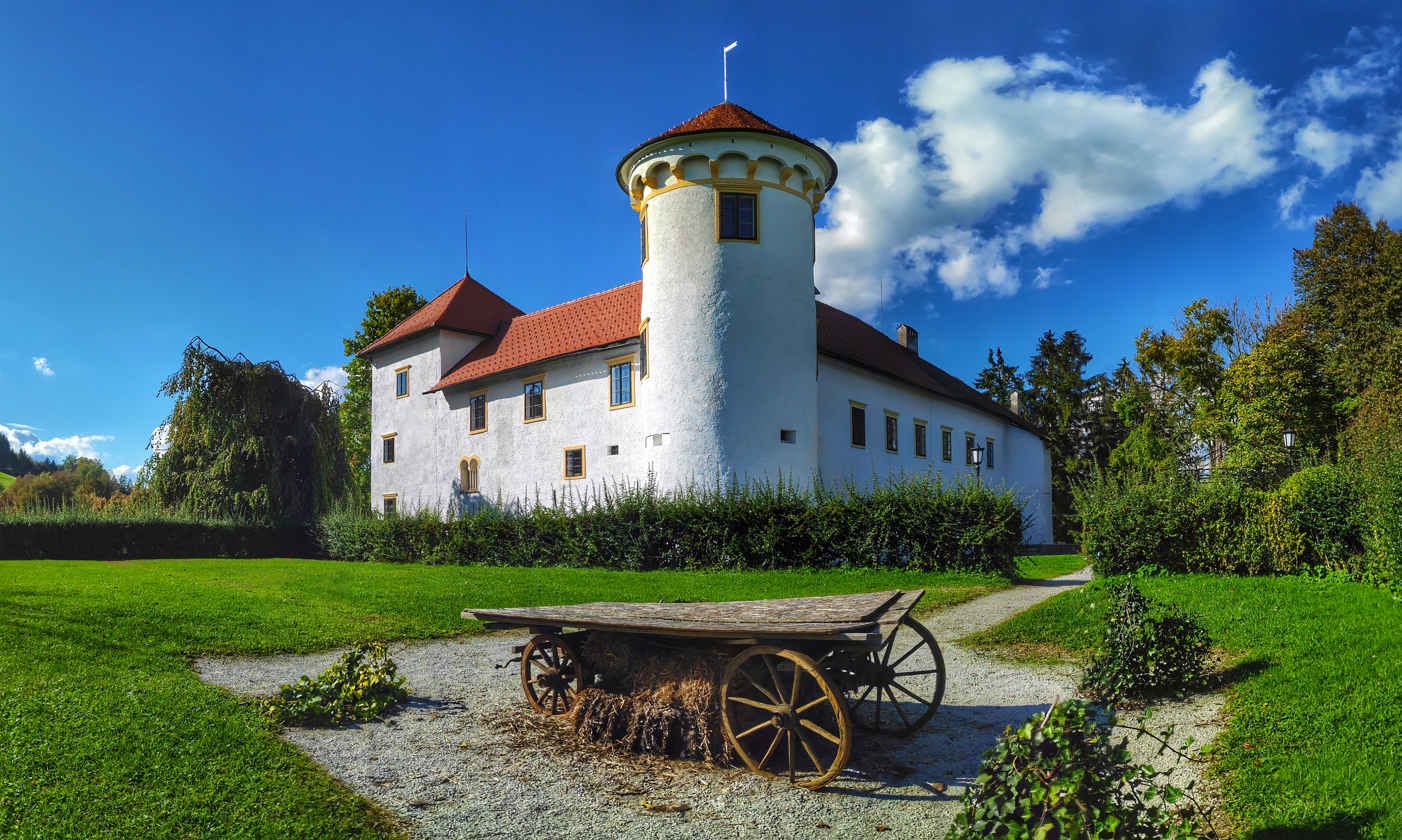
View of Wagensberg Castle from the east

On 20 October 1849 at Ludwigslust Palace, she married Prince Hugo Alfred Adolf Philipp of Windisch-Graetz (1823–1904), the second son of Weriand, 1st Prince of Windisch-Graetz, and Princess Maria Eleonore Karolina von Lobkowicz. Before her death in 1859, they were the parents of:

- Princess Alexandra Maria of Windisch-Graetz (1850–1933), who married Count Rudolf Ladislaus von Khevenhüller-Metsch, the youngest son of Richard, 5th Prince of Khevenhüller-Metsch and Countess Antonia Maria Lichnowsky (a daughter of Prince Eduárd Lichnowsky).
- Princess Olga Marie Friederike Franziska of Windisch-Graetz (1853–1934), who married Count Andrea Mocenigo
- Prince Hugo Weriand Alexander Wilhelm Alfred of Windisch-Graetz (1854–1920), who married Princess Christiane von Auersperg, a daughter of Prince Vincenz von Auersperg (a grandson of Prince Wilhelm I of Auersperg) and Countess Wilhelmine von Colloredo-Mannsfeld, in 1885.
- Princess Marie Gabrielle Ernestine Alexandra of Windisch-Graetz (1856–1929), who married her first cousin, Duke Paul Frederick of Mecklenburg, the second son of Frederick Francis II, Grand Duke of Mecklenburg-Schwerin, and Princess Augusta Reuss of Köstritz.

Luise died on 9 March 1859 in Venice after a short illness. She was buried on 21 March at buried at Wagensberg Castle (now Bogenšperk in Litija, Slovenia) with a funeral service conducted by Ludwig Theodor Elze, the Protestant pastor from Ljubljana.

Hugo succeeded his father as Prince and head of the cadet branch of the House of Windisch-Graetz in 1867. After her death, her husband married Princess Matylda Radziwill, the daughter of Prince Friedrich Wilhelm Radziwill, 14th Duke of Nieśwież (eldest son of Prince Antoni Radziwiłł), and Countess Mathilde Christina von Clary und Aldringen (a daughter of Carl Joseph, 3rd Prince of Clary-Aldringen), at Teplitz on 9 October 1867. He had three more children with Princess Matylda.

== Descendants ==
Through her son Hugo Weriand, she was a grandmother of Princess Marie Luise Christiane Alexandrine (who married Count Giovanni Ceschi a Santa Croce); Prince Hugo Vinzenz Alexander Maria (who married Princess Leontina of Fürstenberg, a daughter of Maximilian Egon II, Prince of Fürstenberg); Princess Elisabeth Mathilde (who married Leone Rosa); Prince Alfred Veriand (who married Princess Marie of Hohenlohe-Langenburg); Prince Eduard Vincenz Heinrich (who married Alix of Isenburg-Büdingen); Princess Olga Maria Paula Josefa (who married Baron Andreas von Morsey genannt Picard and, after their divorce, Count Hubertus Maria von Ledebur-Wicheln); Princess Maria Wilhelmine Albertina Josepha (who married Baron Leonidas Andreas Economo di San Serff); Prince Franz Josef Niklas (who married Desiree von Wagner-Latour Edle von Thurmburg); Princess Marie Gabriele Valentine (who married Prince Hans of Hohenlohe-Schillingsfürst, a son of Prince Viktor II of Hohenlohe-Schillingsfürst, 2nd Duke von Ratibor and Countess Marie Breuner-Enckevoirt); Prince Gottlieb Engelbert Maria Anton (who died unmarried); and Princess Marie Antoinette (who married Count Girolamo di Bosdari).
