= Hugo, 2nd Prince of Windisch-Graetz =

Austrian Prince

Hugo Alfred
- Prince of Windisch-Graetz
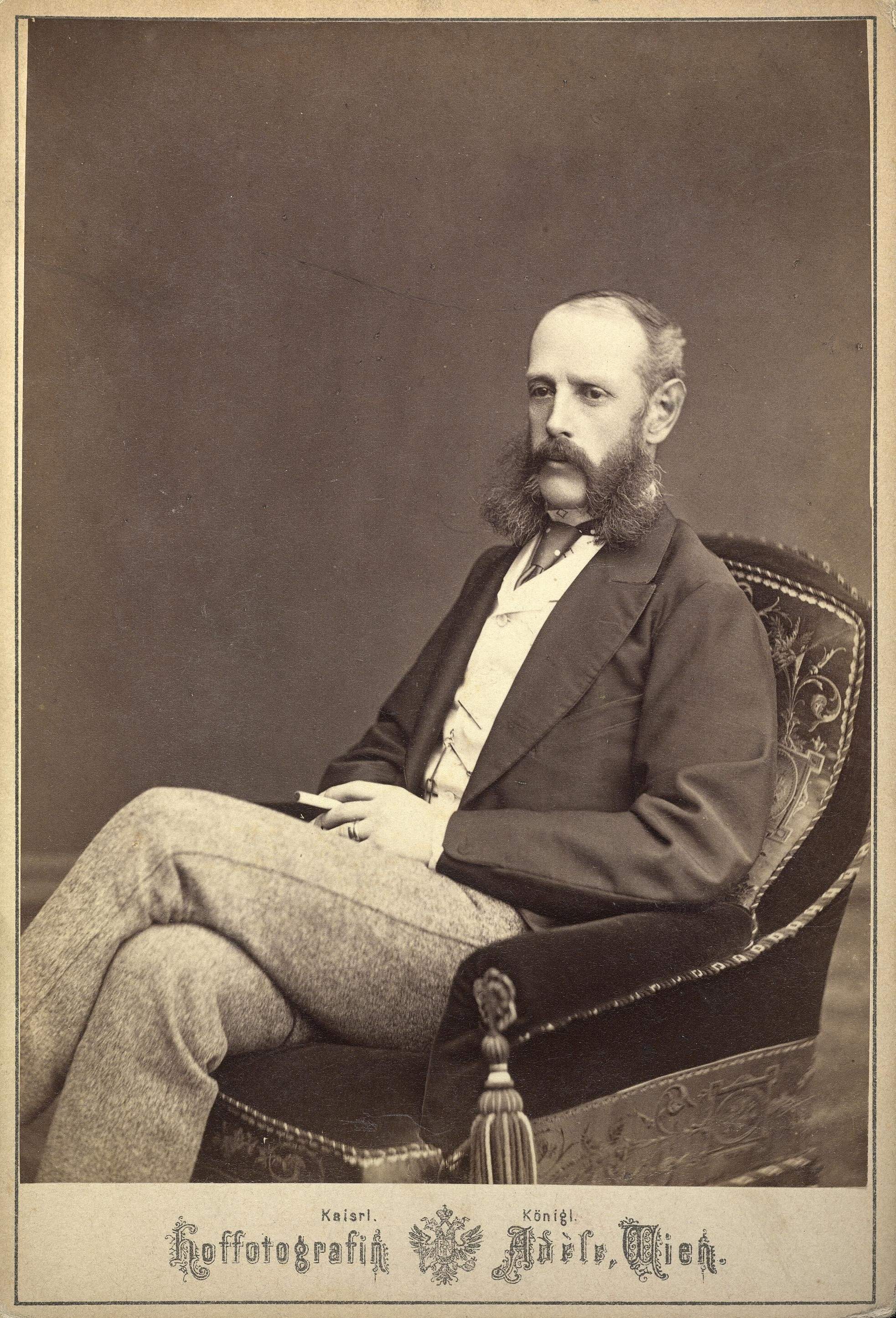
- Photograph by Atelier Adèle

Prince of Windisch-Graetz
- Tenure: 1869–1904
- Predecessor: Weriand
- Successor: Hugo Weriand
- Born: 26 May 1823; Vienna, Austria-Hungary
- Died: 26 November 1904 (aged 81); Haasberg Castle, Austria-Hungary
- Spouse: Duchess Luise of Mecklenburg-Schwerin (m. 1849; died 1859) Princess Matylda Radziwill (m. 1867)
- Issue: Princess Alexandra of Windisch-Graetz; Princess Olga of Windisch-Graetz; Hugo, 3rd Prince of Windisch-Graetz; Princess Marie of Windisch-Graetz; Prince Ernst of Windisch-Graetz; Princess Luise of Windisch-Graetz; Princess Elisabeth of Windisch-Graetz
Names
- Hugo Alfred Adolf Philipp zu Windisch-Grätz
- House: Windisch-Graetz
- Father: Weriand, 1st Prince of Windisch-Graetz
- Mother: Princess Maria Eleonore Karolina von Lobkowicz

Hugo Alfred Adolf Philipp, 2nd Prince of Windisch-Graetz (26 May 1823 – 26 November 1904) was an Austrian prince and landowner.

== Early life ==
Hugo Alfred was born in Vienna on 26 May 1823. He was the second son of Weriand, 1st Prince of Windisch-Graetz, and Princess Maria Eleonore Karolina von Lobkowicz (1795–1876). His elder brother, Prince Karl, married their cousin, Princess Mathilde of Windisch-Graetz (a daughter of Alfred I, Prince of Windisch-Grätz). His younger siblings included Princess Gabriele (who married Count Friedrich Wilhelm Edmund von Schönburg-Glauchau); Prince Ernst (who married Princess Camilla of Oettingen-Oettingen and Oettingen-Spielberg); and Prince Robert (who died unmarried).

His paternal grandparents were Count Joseph Nicholas of Windisch-Graetz and Duchess Maria Leopoldine Franziska of Arenberg (a daughter of Charles Marie Raymond, 5th Duke of Arenberg). His paternal uncle, Alfred I, Prince of Windisch-Grätz, had been elevated to the rank of prince in 1804. His maternal grandparents were Joseph Franz Maximilian, 7th Prince of Lobkowicz and Princess Maria Karolina von Schwarzenberg (a daughter of Johann I, Prince of Schwarzenberg).

== Career ==
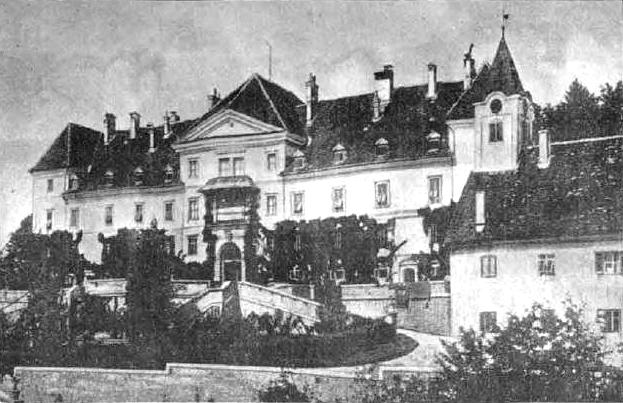
Haasberg Castle, c. 1925

Like his uncle in 1804, his father was elevated to the rank of hereditary prince in 1822. Upon the death of his elder brother Prince Karl at the Battle of Solferino in 1859 during the Second Italian War of Independence, he became the heir of his father. Upon his father's death at Haasberg Castle on 27 October 1867, he succeeded as the 2nd Prince of Windisch-Graetz, in the cadet branch. a mediatised house whose members historically bore the style of "Serene Highness".

From his father, he inherited a number of palatial residences, including his main residence, Haasberg Castle in Carniola (now Planina, Slovenia); (Note: Haasberg Castle was in Inner Carniola, which became part of the Napoleonic Illyrian Provinces from 1809, before returning to the Austrian Empire by the 1814 Treaty of Paris. First administrated within the Austrian Kingdom of Illyria, the Carniolan duchy again became a Habsburg crown land from 1849 until 1919.) Gonobitz Castle (now Slovenske Konjice, Slovenia), which his father acquired in 1826 and which also included the Seiz Carthusian monastery; Podsreda Castle in Kozje; Predjama Castle, which his father acquired in 1846; and Wagensberg Castle (now Bogenšperk in Litija, Slovenia), which his father acquired in 1853. (Note: His father had acquired the numerous castles, in what is now Slovenia, from the assets of his mother's estate (Hugo's paternal grandmother, Duchess Maria Leopoldine Franziska of Arenberg, a daughter of extremely wealthy, Charles Marie Raymond, 5th Duke of Arenberg).)

== Personal life ==
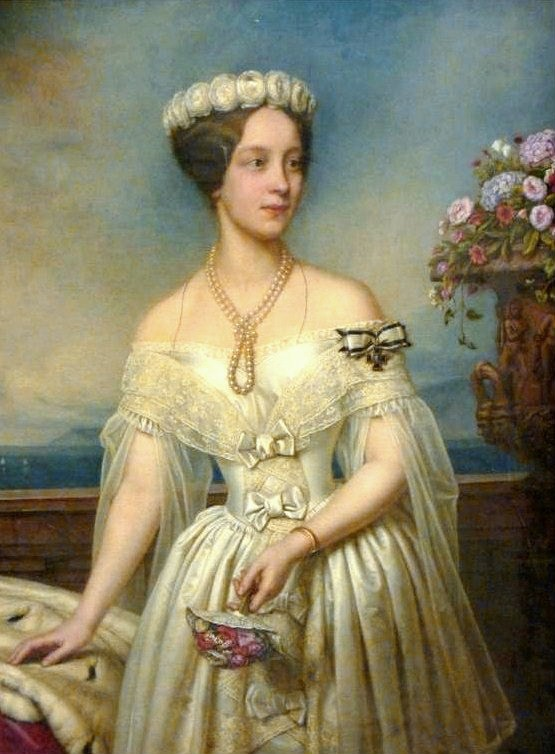
Portrait of his first wife, Duchess Luise, by Joseph Karl Stieler, 1849

At Ludwigslust Palace on 20 October 1849, he married Duchess Luise Marie Helene of Mecklenburg-Schwerin (1824–1859), a daughter of Paul Frederick, Grand Duke of Mecklenburg-Schwerin and Princess Alexandrine of Prussia (a younger daughter of King Frederick William III of Prussia and Duchess Louise of Mecklenburg-Strelitz). Among her siblings were Frederick Francis II, Grand Duke of Mecklenburg-Schwerin and Duke William of Mecklenburg-Schwerin (who married their cousin, Princess Alexandrine of Prussia, daughter of Prince Albert of Prussia). Before her death on 9 March 1859 in Venice after a short illness, they were the parents of:

- Princess Alexandra Maria of Windisch-Graetz (1850–1933), who married Count Rudolf Ladislaus von Khevenhüller-Metsch, the youngest son of Richard, 5th Prince of Khevenhüller-Metsch and Countess Antonia Maria Lichnowsky (a daughter of Prince Eduárd Lichnowsky).
- Princess Olga Marie Friederike Franziska of Windisch-Graetz (1853–1934), who married Andreas Mocenigo
- Prince Hugo Weriand Alexander Wilhelm Alfred of Windisch-Graetz (1854–1920), who married Princess Christiane von Auersperg, a daughter of Prince Vincenz von Auersperg (a grandson of Prince Wilhelm I of Auersperg) and Wilhelmine von Colloredo-Mannsfeld, in 1885.
- Princess Marie Gabrielle Ernestine Alexandra of Windisch-Graetz (1856–1929), who married her first cousin, Duke Paul Frederick of Mecklenburg, the second son of Frederick Francis II, Grand Duke of Mecklenburg-Schwerin, and Princess Augusta Reuss of Köstritz.

After his wife died in 1859 and was buried at Wagensberg Castle (now Bogenšperk in Litija, Slovenia), he married Princess Matylda Christina Radziwill (1836–1918), the daughter of Prince Wilhelm Radziwiłł, 14th Duke of Nieśwież (eldest son of Prince Antoni Radziwiłł), and Countess Mathilde Christina von Clary und Aldringen (a daughter of Carl Joseph, 3rd Prince of Clary-Aldringen), at Teplitz on 9 October 1867. Together, they had three more children:

- Prince Ernst Wilhelm of Windisch-Graetz (1872–1897), who died unmarried.
- Princess Aloisia "Luise" Maria Mathilde of Windisch-Graetz (1874–1888), who died young.
- Princess Elisabeth Maria Mathilde of Windisch-Graetz (1876–1884), who died young.

The Prince died at Haasberg Castle in Planina (today part of Slovenia) on 15 May 1920. He was succeeded by his eldest son, Prince Hugo Weriand.

=== Descendants ===
Through his son Hugo Weriand, he was a grandfather of Princess Marie Luise Christiane Alexandrine (who married Count Giovanni Ceschi a Santa Croce); Prince Hugo Vinzenz Alexander Maria (who married Princess Leontina of Fürstenberg, a daughter of Maximilian Egon II, Prince of Fürstenberg); Princess Elisabeth Mathilde (who married Leone Rosa); Prince Alfred Veriand (who married Princess Marie of Hohenlohe-Langenburg); Prince Eduard Vincenz Heinrich (who married Alix of Isenburg-Büdingen); Princess Olga Maria Paula Josefa (who married Baron Andreas von Morsey genannt Picard and, after their divorce, Count Hubertus Maria von Ledebur-Wicheln); Princess Maria Wilhelmine Albertina Josepha (who married Baron Leonidas Andreas Economo di San Serff); Prince Franz Josef Niklas (who married Desiree von Wagner-Latour Edle von Thurmburg); Princess Marie Gabriele Valentine (who married Prince Hans of Hohenlohe-Schillingsfürst, a son of Prince Viktor II of Hohenlohe-Schillingsfürst, 2nd Duke von Ratibor and Countess Marie Breuner-Enckevoirt); Prince Gottlieb Engelbert Maria Anton (who died unmarried); and Princess Marie Antoinette (who married Count Girolamo di Bosdari).
