= Hugo, 3rd Prince of Windisch-Graetz =

Head of the Austrian House of Windisch-Graetz

Hugo Weriand
- Prince of Windisch-Graetz
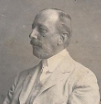

Head of the House of Windisch-Graetz
- Tenure: 1904–1920
- Predecessor: Hugo Alfred
- Successor: Hugo Vinzenz
- Born: 17 November 1854; Florence, Grand Duchy of Tuscany
- Died: 15 May 1920 (aged 65); Haasberg Castle, Planina, Kingdom of Italy
- Spouse: Princess Christiane von Auersperg (m. 1885; died 1920)
- Issue: Princess Marie Luise; Prince Hugo Vinzenz; Princess Elisabeth Mathilde; Prince Alfred Veriand; Prince Eduard Vincenz; Princess Olga Maria; Princess Maria Wilhelmine; Prince Franz Josef; Princess Marie Gabriele; Prince Gottlieb Engelbert; Princess Marie Antoinette
Names
- Hugo Weriand Alexander Wilhelm Alfred von Windisch-Graetz
- House: Windisch-Graetz
- Father: Hugo, 2nd Prince of Windisch-Graetz
- Mother: Duchess Luise of Mecklenburg-Schwerin

Hugo Weriand Alexander Wilhelm Alfred, 3rd Prince of Windisch-Graetz (17 November 1854 – 15 May 1920) was an Austrian prince.

== Early life ==
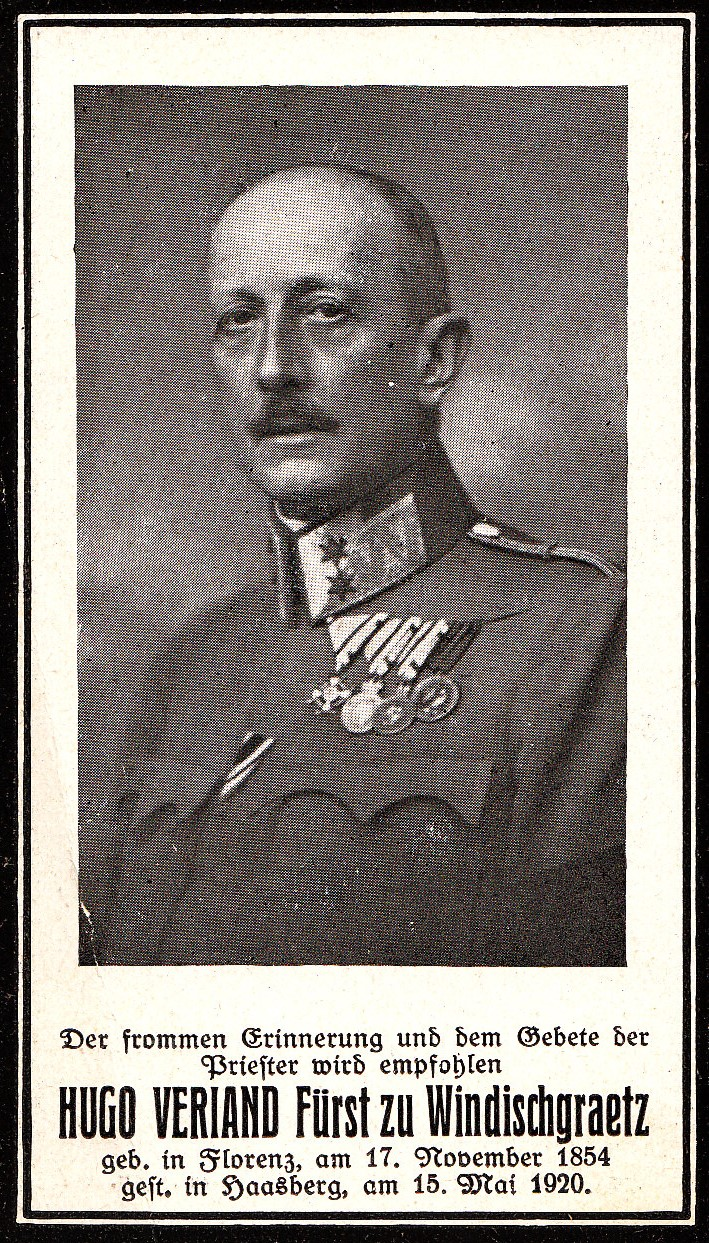

Hugo Vinzenz was born at Florence in the Grand Duchy of Tuscany on 17 November 1854. He was the son of Hugo, 2nd Prince of Windisch-Graetz (1823–1904) and Duchess Luise of Mecklenburg-Schwerin (1824–1859). From his parents' marriage, his siblings were Princess Alexandrine (wife of Count Rudolf von Khevenhüller-Metsch), (Note: Count Rudolf Ladislaus von Khevenhüller-Metsch (1844–1910), was the youngest son of Richard, 5th Prince of Khevenhüller-Metsch and Countess Antonia Maria Lichnowsky (a daughter of Prince Eduárd Lichnowsky).) Princess Olga (wife of Andreas Mocenigo), and Princess Marie (who married their first cousin, Duke Paul Frederick of Mecklenburg). (Note: His brother-in-law, and first cousin, Duke Paul Frederick of Mecklenburg (1852–1923), was the second son of Frederick Francis II, Grand Duke of Mecklenburg-Schwerin, and Princess Augusta Reuss of Köstritz.) After his mother died in 1859, his father married Princess Matylda Radziwill, (Note: Prince Hugo's stepmother, Princess Matylda Radziwill (1836–1918), was the daughter of Prince Wilhelm Radziwiłł (eldest son of Prince Antoni Radziwiłł), and Mathilde Christina Clary-Aldringen (a daughter of Carl Joseph, 3rd Prince of Clary-Aldringen).) with whom his father had three more children: Prince Ernst Wilhelm; Princess Aloisia Maria Mathilde and Princess Elisabeth Maria Mathilde; all of whom died unmarried.

His paternal grandparents were Weriand, 1st Prince of Windisch-Graetz (a son of Count Joseph Nicholas of Windisch-Graetz) and Princess Maria Lobkowicz (a daughter of Joseph Franz Maximilian, 7th Prince of Lobkowicz). His maternal grandparents were Paul Frederick, Grand Duke of Mecklenburg-Schwerin and Princess Alexandrine of Prussia.

== Career ==
When his father died in 1904, Windisch-Graetz succeeded as head of a cadet branch of the House of Windisch-Graetz, a mediatised house whose members historically bore the style of "Serene Highness".

== Personal life ==
On 16 May 1885 in Vienna, he married Princess Christiane von Auersperg (1866–1962), a daughter of Prince Vincenz von Auersperg (a grandson of Prince Wilhelm I of Auersperg) and Wilhelmine von Colloredo-Mannsfeld. Together, they were the parents of:

- Princess Marie Luise Christiane Alexandrine (1886–1976), who married Count Giovanni Ceschi a Santa Croce, a son of Count Luigi Ceschi a Santa Croce and Leopoldine von Thun und Hohenstein, in 1911.
- Prince Hugo Vinzenz Alexander Maria (1887–1959), who married Princess Leontina of Fürstenberg, a daughter of Maximilian Egon II, Prince of Fürstenberg and Countess Irma von Schönborn-Buchheim (a daughter of Erwein, 4th Count of Schönborn-Buchheim), in 1912.
- Princess Elisabeth Mathilde (1889–1983), who married Leone Rosa in 1961.
- Prince Alfred Veriand (1890–1972), who married Princess Marie of Hohenlohe-Langenburg, a daughter of Prince Gottfried Karl of Hohenlohe-Langenburg and Countess Anna Marie von Schönborn-Buchheim, in 1929.
- Prince Eduard Vincenz Heinrich (1891–1976), who married Alix of Isenburg-Büdingen, a daughter of Prince Franz Joseph of Isenburg-Büdingen (second son of Karl II, Prince of Isenburg-Birstein) and Friederike Maria Theresia of Solms-Braunfels, in 1923.
- Princess Olga Maria Paula Josefa (1893–1987), who married Baron Andreas von Morsey genannt Picard, a son of Baron Franz Adolf von Morsey gennant Picard, in 1916. They divorced in 1937 and she married Count Hubertus Maria von Ledebur-Wicheln, a son of Count Adolf Maria von Ledebur-Wicheln, in 1938.
- Princess Maria Wilhelmine Albertina Josepha (1895–1989), who married Baron Leonidas Andreas Economo di San Serff, a son of Baron Johann Andreas Economo de San Serff and Helene Muráty, in 1916.
- Prince Franz Josef Niklas (1896–1968), who married Desiree von Wagner-Latour Edle von Thurmburg, in 1937.
- Princess Marie Gabriele Valentine (1898–1992), who married Prince Hans of Hohenlohe-Schillingsfürst, a son of Prince Viktor II of Hohenlohe-Schillingsfürst, 2nd Duke von Ratibor and Countess Marie Breuner-Enckevoirt, in 1918.
- Prince Gottlieb Engelbert Maria Anton (1899–1945), who died unmarried.
- Princess Marie Antoinette (1911–2002), who married Count Girolamo di Bosdari, a son of Count Filippo di Bosdari and Beatrice Rossi, in 1941.

The Prince died at Haasberg Castle in Planina in the Kingdom of Italy (today part of Slovenia) on 15 May 1920. He was succeeded by his eldest son, Prince Hugo Vinzenz.

=== Descendants ===
Through his son Prince Hugo, he was a grandfather of Princess Irma (who married Franz, 2nd Prince of Weikersheim); (Note: Prince Franz's father, Carl, 2nd Prince of Weikersheim, was born as Baron Carl von Bronn (1862–1925), the eldest son of Carl Ludwig II, Prince of Hohenlohe-Langenburg and his morganatic wife, Maria Grathwohl, who was created Baroness von Bronn in the nobility of Württemberg upon their marriage. Baron Carl was elevated to the title of Prince von Weikersheim in 1911 by Emperor Franz Joseph I of Austria, for civil services rendered to the Austrian empire. All of his descendants were made Counts and Countesses von Weikersheim.) Prince Hugo Maximilian (who was killed in action over Italy during World War II); Prince Maximilian Antonius (who married Doña Maria Luisa Serra di Gerace, the legitimatised daughter of Gian Battista Serra, 12th Prince of Gerace); and Prince Friedrich Karl (who married Princess Dorothea of Hesse, a daughter of Prince Christoph of Hesse and Princess Sophie of Greece and Denmark).
