= Hugo, 4th Prince of Windisch-Graetz =

Head of the Austrian House of Windisch-Graetz

Hugo Vinzenz
- Prince of Windisch-Graetz

Head of the House of Windisch-Graetz
- Tenure: 1920–1959
- Predecessor: Hugo Weriand
- Successor: Maximilian Antonius
- Born: 30 July 1887; Planina, Duchy of Carniola
- Died: 26 May 1959 (aged 71); Trieste, Italy
- Spouse: Princess Leontina of Fürstenberg (m. 1912; died 1959)
- Issue Detail: Princess Irma; Prince Hugo Maximilian; Prince Maximilian Antonius; Prince Friedrich Karl
- House: Windisch-Graetz
- Father: Hugo, 3rd Prince of Windisch-Graetz
- Mother: Christiane von Auersperg

Hugo Vinzenz Alexander Maria, 4th Prince of Windisch-Graetz (30 July 1887 – 26 May 1959) was an Austrian prince.

== Early life ==
Hugo Vinzenz was born at Haasberg Castle in Planina in the Duchy of Carniola (today part of Slovenia) on 30 July 1887. He was the son of Hugo, 3rd Prince of Windisch-Graetz (1854–1920) and Christiane von Auersperg (1866–1962).

His paternal grandparents were Hugo, 2nd Prince of Windisch-Graetz and Duchess Luise of Mecklenburg-Schwerin (a daughter of Paul Frederick, Grand Duke of Mecklenburg-Schwerin and Princess Alexandrine of Prussia). His maternal aunt, Princess Marie of Windisch-Graetz, married her first cousin, Duke Paul Frederick of Mecklenburg (second son of Frederick Francis II, Grand Duke of Mecklenburg-Schwerin, and Princess Augusta Reuss of Köstritz). His maternal grandparents were Vincenz von Auersperg (a grandson of Prince Wilhelm I of Auersperg) and Wilhelmine von Colloredo-Mannsfeld.

== Career ==
When his father died in 1920, Windisch-Graetz succeeded as head of a cadet branch of the House of Windisch-Graetz, a mediatised house whose members historically bore the style of "Serene Highness".

== Personal life ==
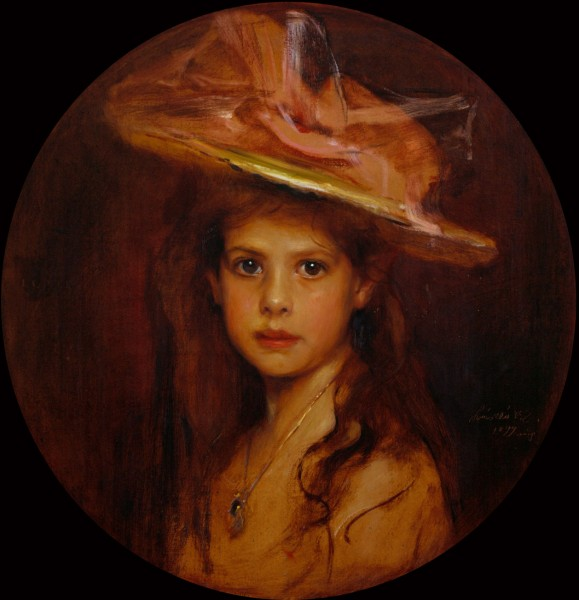
Portrait of his wife, Princess Leontina, as a child, by Philip de László, 1899

On 26 November 1912 at Donaueschingen Palace, he married Princess Leontina "Lotti" of Fürstenberg (1892–1979), a daughter of Maximilian Egon II, Prince of Fürstenberg and Countess Irma von Schönborn-Buchheim (a daughter of Erwein, 4th Count of Schönborn-Buchheim, and Countess Franziska von Trauttmansdorff-Weinsberg). Together, they were the parents of:

- Princess Irma Christiane Maximiliana Egona Huberta Maria Hugo of Windisch-Graetz (1913–1984), who married Franz, 2nd Prince of Weikersheim, son of Carl, 1st Prince of Weikersheim, and Countess Marie Czernin von und zu Chudenitz, (Note: Prince Franz's father, Carl, 2nd Prince of Weikersheim, was born as Baron Carl von Bronn (1862–1925), the eldest son of Carl Ludwig II, Prince of Hohenlohe-Langenburg and his morganatic wife, Maria Grathwohl, who was created Baroness von Bronn in the nobility of Württemberg upon their marriage. Baron Carl was elevated to the title of Prince von Weikersheim in 1911 by Emperor Franz Joseph I of Austria, for civil services rendered to the Austrian empire. All of his descendants were made Counts and Countesses von Weikersheim.) in 1936.
- Prince Hugo Maximilian Weriand Friedrich Hubertus Aegidius Maria of Windisch-Graetz (1914–1942), a twin; he was killed in action over Italy during World War II.
- Prince Maximilian Antonius Aegidius Hubertus Maria Hugo of Windisch-Graetz (1914–1976), a twin; he married Doña Maria Luisa Serra di Gerace, the legitimatised daughter of Gian Battista Serra, 12th Prince of Gerace and Donna Maria Grazia Carafa d'Andria, in 1946.
- Prince Friedrich Karl Hugo Maximilian Maria Cyrillus Felix Hubertus of Windisch-Graetz (1917–2002), who married Princess Dorothea of Hesse, a daughter of Prince Christoph of Hesse and Princess Sophie of Greece and Denmark (a sister of Prince Philip, Duke of Edinburgh) in 1959.

The Prince died at Trieste in Friuli-Venezia Giulia, Italy on 26 May 1959. As he was predeceased by his eldest son, he was succeeded by his second son, Prince Maximilian Antonius.

=== Descendants ===
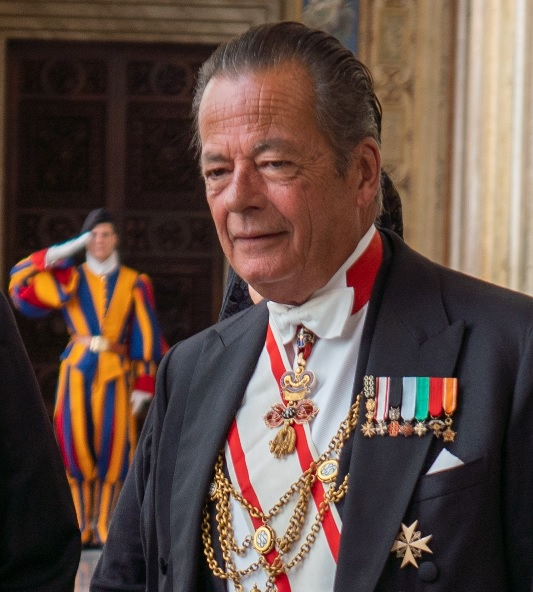
Mariano Hugo, 6th Prince of Windisch-Graetz, 2019

Through his second son, Maximilian, he was a grandfather of Mariano Hugo, 6th Prince of Windisch-Graetz (b. 1955), who married Archduchess Sophie of Austria (a daughter of Archduke Ferdinand Karl Max of Austria); Princess Christiana "Irma", who married Don Augusto Ruffo di Calabria (nephew of Queen Paola of Belgium); Princess Maximiliane, who married Prince Heinrich zu Fürstenberg; and Prince Manfred, who married Maria Vittoria Lepri di Rota.
