= Weriand, 1st Prince of Windisch-Graetz =

His Serene Highness Weriand of Windisch-Graetz
- Prince of Windischgrätz
- Tenure: 1822–1867
- Successor: Hugo, 2nd Prince of Windisch-Graetz
- Born: 31 May 1790; Strasbourg, Bas-Rhin, France
- Died: 27 October 1867 (aged 77); Haasberg Castle, Austria-Hungary
- Noble family: Windisch-Graetz
- Spouse: Princess Maria Eleonore Karolina of Lobkowicz
- Issue: Prince Karl of Windisch-Graetz; Hugo, Prince of Windisch-Graetz; Princess Gabriele of Windisch-Graetz; Prince Ernst of Windisch-Graetz; Prince Robert of Windisch-Graetz
- Father: Joseph Nicholas of Windisch-Graetz
- Mother: Duchess Maria Leopoldine Franziska of Arenberg

Weriand Alois Leopold Ulrich Johann Paul, Prince of Windisch-Graetz (31 May 1790 – 27 October 1867), was a Slovenian-Austrian prince and landowner.

== Early life ==
He was the third, but second surviving, son of Duchess Maria Leopoldine Franziska of Arenberg (1751–1812) and Count Joseph Nicholas of Windisch-Graetz. His elder sister, Countess Sophie Luise Wilhelmine of Windisch-Graetz, married Prince Karl of Löwenstein-Wertheim-Rosenberg (the son of Dominic Constantine, Prince of Löwenstein-Wertheim-Rochefort). His elder surviving brother was Alfred I, Prince of Windisch-Grätz, who married Princess Marie Eleonore Philippine Luise of Schwarzenberg (daughter of Prince Josef Johann of Schwarzenberg), and was raised to the rank of prince in 1804.

His paternal grandparents were Count Leopold Carl Joseph of Windish-Graetz and Countess Maria Antonia Josepha von Khevenhüller. As his grandfather died young, his father was the heir of his great-grandfather, Count Leopold Johann Victorin Windisch-Graetz (who owned Červená Lhota Castle in Southern Bohemia and the Trautmannsdorf an der Leitha estate in Lower Austria). His maternal grandparents were Charles Marie Raymond, 5th Duke of Arenberg and the former Countess Louise Margarethe von der Marck-Schleiden (a daughter of Count Louis Engelbert von der Marck-Schleiden).

== Career ==
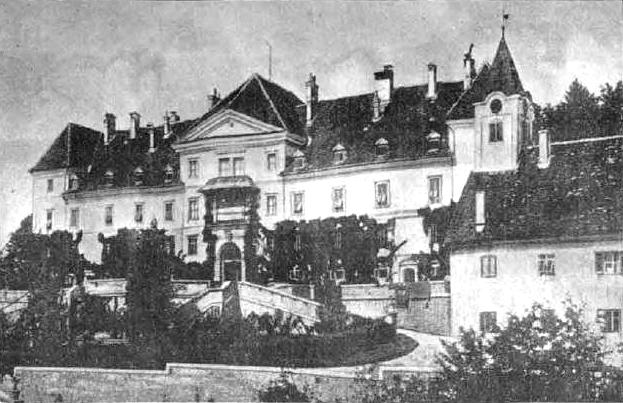
Haasberg Castle, c. 1925

Like his elder brother had been in 1804, he was raised to the rank of hereditary prince in 1822.

From the assets of his mother's estate, he acquired numerous castles in what is now Slovenia, some of which he soon sold again. His main residences were Haasberg Castle in Carniola (now Planina, Slovenia) (Note: Haasberg Castle was in Inner Carniola, which became part of the Napoleonic Illyrian Provinces from 1809, before returning to the Austrian Empire by the 1814 Treaty of Paris. First administrated within the Austrian Kingdom of Illyria, the Carniolan duchy again became a Habsburg crown land from 1849 until 1919.) and Gonobitz Castle (now Slovenske Konjice, Slovenia), which he acquired in 1826 and which also included the Seiz Carthusian monastery. For a short time he owned Žamberk Castle with Helvíkovice, Podsreda Castle in Kozje, Predjama Castle in 1846, and Wagensberg Castle (now Bogenšperk in Litija, Slovenia) in 1853.

== Personal life ==
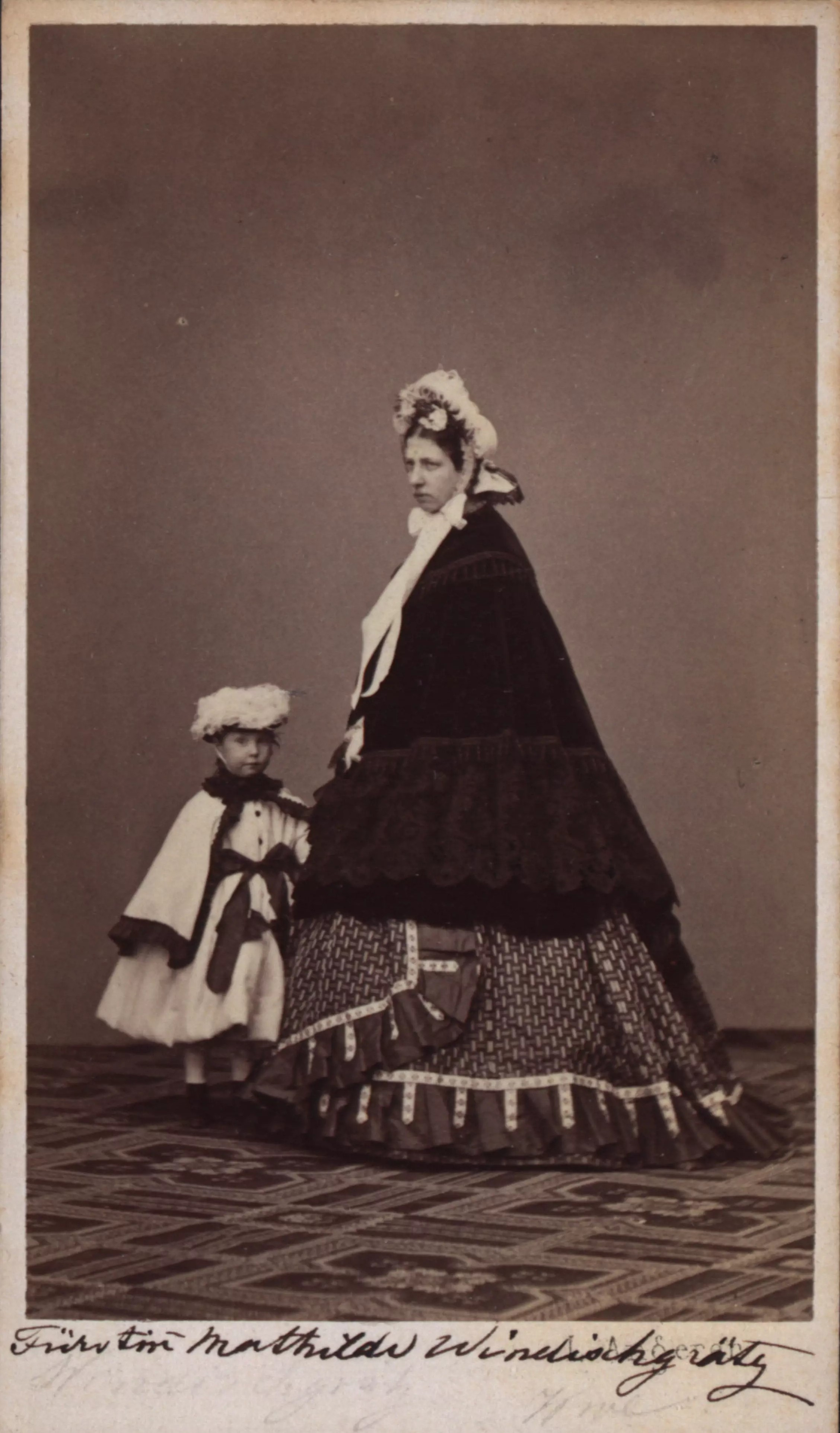
Photograph of his daughter-in-law (and niece), Princess Mathilde of Windisch-Graetz, with his granddaughter, Princess Eleonore of Windisch-Grätz, by Ludwig Angerer, c. 1862–1865

On 11 October 1812 at Vienna, Windisch-Graetz was married to Princess Maria Eleonore Karolina von Lobkowicz (1795–1876), a daughter of Joseph Franz Maximilian, 7th Prince of Lobkowicz and Princess Maria Karolina von Schwarzenberg (a daughter of Johann I, Prince of Schwarzenberg). Together, they were the parents of:

- Prince Karl Vincenz Weriand Joseph Gabriel of Windisch-Graetz (1821–1859), who married his cousin, Princess Mathilde of Windisch-Graetz, daughter of Alfred I, Prince of Windisch-Grätz, in 1857; he was killed at the Battle of Solferino during the Second Italian War of Independence.
- Prince Hugo Alfred Adolf Philipp of Windisch-Graetz (1823–1904), who married Duchess Luise of Mecklenburg-Schwerin, a daughter of Paul Frederick, Grand Duke of Mecklenburg-Schwerin and Princess Alexandrine of Prussia, in 1849. After her death in 1859, he married Princess Matilda Radziwill, the daughter of Prince Friedrich Wilhelm Radziwill, 14th Duke of Nieśwież (eldest son of Prince Antoni Radziwiłł), and Princess Mathilde Christina of Clary-Aldringen, in 1867.
- Princess Gabriele Marianne Caroline Aglae of Windisch-Graetz (1824–1917), who married Count Friedrich Wilhelm Edmund von Schönburg-Glauchau, a son of Count Heinrich Gottlob Otto Ernest von Schönburg-Glauchau, and Princess Marie Klementine von Schönburg-Waldenburg, in 1852.
- Prince Ernst Ferdinand Weriand of Windisch-Graetz (1827–1918), who married Princess Camilla of Oettingen-Oettingen, a daughter of Prince Otto Carl of Oettingen-Oettingen and Oettingen-Spielberg, and Countess Georgine of Königsegg-Aulendorf, in 1870. Ernst Ferdinand and Camilla are the parents of Prince Otto of Windisch-Graetz.
- Prince Robert Johann Joseph of Windisch-Graetz (1831–1913), who died unmarried.

Prince Weriand died at Haasberg Castle on 27 October 1867. As he was predeceased by his eldest son, who died without male issue, his second son, Hugo, became the 2nd Prince of Windisch-Graetz.

=== Descendants ===
Through his son Hugo, he was a grandfather of Hugo, 3rd Prince of Windisch-Graetz, who married Princess Christiane von Auersperg (a daughter of Prince Vincenz von Auersperg); Princess Alexandrine (wife of Count Rudolf von Khevenhüller-Metsch), (Note: Count Rudolf Ladislaus von Khevenhüller-Metsch (1844–1910), was the youngest son of Richard, 5th Prince of Khevenhüller-Metsch and Countess Antonia Maria Lichnowsky (a daughter of Prince Eduárd Lichnowsky).) Princess Olga (wife of Andreas Mocenigo), and Princess Marie (who married her first cousin, Duke Paul Frederick of Mecklenburg); (Note: Duke Paul Frederick of Mecklenburg (1852–1923), was the second son of Frederick Francis II, Grand Duke of Mecklenburg-Schwerin, and Princess Augusta Reuss of Köstritz.) Prince Ernst Wilhelm; Princess Aloisia Maria Mathilde; and Princess Elisabeth Maria Mathilde.

== Ancestry ==
Ancestors of Weriand, 1st Prince of Windisch-Graetz

8. Count Viktorin Karl of Windisch-Grätz
4. Count Leopold Karl of Windisch-Grätz
9. Countess Marie Ernestine of Strassoldo
2. Count Joseph Nicholas of Windisch-Graetz
10. Count Ludwig Andreas of Khevenhüller
5. Countess Maria Antonia of Khevenhüller
11. Baroness Philippina Maria Anna Josepha von Lamberg
1. Weriand, Prince of Windisch-Grätz
12. Leopold Philippe of Arenberg, 4th Duke of Arenberg, 10th Duke of Aarschot
6. Charles Marie Raymond, 5th Duke of Arenberg, 11th Duke of Aarschot
13. Donna Maria Francesca Pignatelli, Duchess of Bisaccia, Countess of Egmond
3. Princess and Duchess Leopoldine of Arenberg
14. Louis Engelbert, Count of La Marck
7. Countess Louise Marguerite de La Marck et de Schleiden
15. Marie Anne Hyacinthe de Visdelou, Dame de Bienassis
