= Princess Marie of Windisch-Graetz =

Duchess Marie of Mecklenburg-Schwerin

Princess Marie
- Duchess Paul Frederick of Mecklenburg-Schwerin
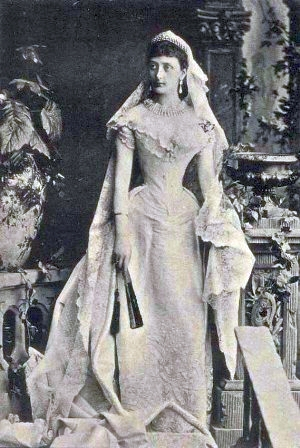
- Duchess Marie of Mecklenburg in her wedding
- Born: 11 December 1856; Vienna, Austrian Empire
- Died: 9 August 1929 (aged 72); Ludwigslust, Mecklenburg-Vorpommern, Germany
- Spouse: Duke Paul Frederick of Mecklenburg (m. 1881; died 1923)
- Issue: Duke Paul Friedrich; Duchess Marie Louise; Duchess Marie Antoinette; Duke Henry Borwin; Duke Joseph
Names
- Marie Gabriele Ernestine Alexandra, Princess of Windisch-Graetz
- House: House of Windisch-Graetz (by birth); House of Mecklenburg-Schwerin (by marriage)
- Father: Hugo, Prince of Windisch-Grätz
- Mother: Duchess Luise of Mecklenburg-Schwerin

Princess Marie of Windisch-Graetz (11 December 1856 – 9 August 1929) was an Austrian noblewoman and a noted archaeologist.

== Early life ==
Princess Marie Gabriele Ernestine Alexandra was born in Vienna in 1856 as the youngest daughter of Hugo, Prince of Windisch-Grätz and, his first wife, Duchess Luise of Mecklenburg-Schwerin. Among her siblings were Hugo, 3rd Prince of Windisch-Graetz (who married Princess Christiane von Auersperg); Princess Alexandrine (wife of Count Rudolf von Khevenhüller-Metsch), (Note: Count Rudolf Ladislaus von Khevenhüller-Metsch (1844–1910), was the youngest son of Richard, 5th Prince of Khevenhüller-Metsch and Countess Antonia Maria Lichnowsky (a daughter of Prince Eduárd Lichnowsky).) Princess Olga (wife of Count Andreas Mocenigo). After her mother died in 1859, her father married Princess Matilda Radziwill (1836-1918), (Note: Prince Hugo's stepmother, Princess Matilda Radziwill (1836–1918), was the daughter of Prince Friedrich Wilhelm Radziwill (eldest son of Prince Antoni Radziwiłł), and Mathilde Christina Clary-Aldringen (a daughter of Carl Joseph, 3rd Prince of Clary-Aldringen).) with whom he had three more children: Prince Ernst Wilhelm of Widisch-Graetz (1872-1897); Princess Aloisia Maria Mathilde of Widisch-Graetz (1874-1888) and Princess Elisabeth Maria Mathilde of Widisch-Graetz (1876-1884); all of whom died unmarried.

Her paternal grandparents were Weriand, 1st Prince of Windisch-Graetz and Princess Maria Eleonore Carolina of Lobkowicz (1795-1876). Her maternal grandparents were Grand Duke Paul Frederick and Princess Alexandrine of Prussia.

== Archaeological interests ==
Marie née Windisch-Graetz surveyed several archaeological excavations in Austria and Carniola, including excavations at Hallstatt Archaeological Site in Vače. Some of the artifacts were sold to museums in Harvard, Oxford and Berlin by her daughter Duchess Marie Antoinette of Mecklenburg.

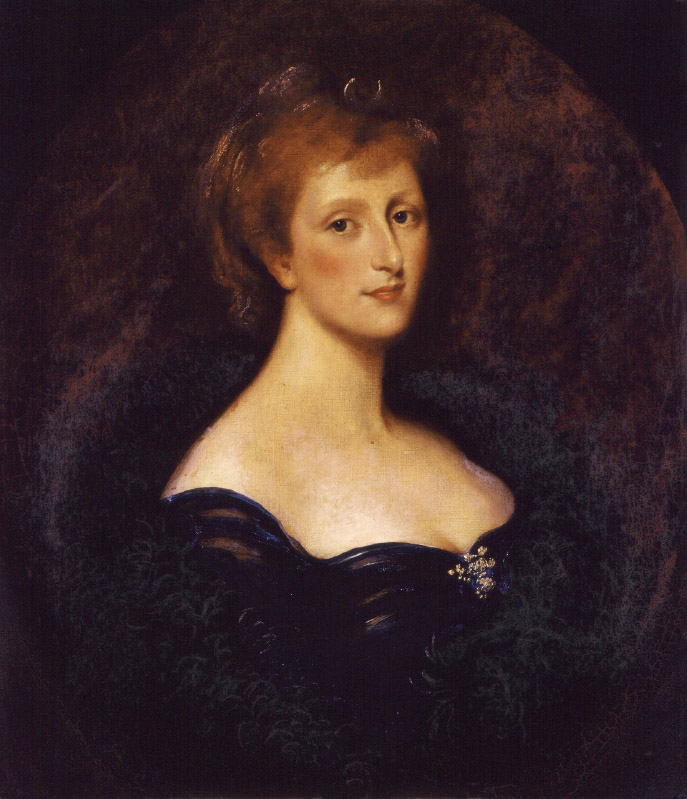
Portrait by Wiliam Turner Dannat (1890)

== Personal life ==
In Schwerin on 5 May 1881, she married her first cousin, the German-born Duke Paul Frederick of Mecklenburg-Schwerin, second son of Frederick Francis II, Grand Duke of Mecklenburg-Schwerin, and his wife, Princess Augusta Reuss of Köstritz.

The couple had five children, three of whom survived to adulthood, including:

- Duke Paul Friedrich of Mecklenburg (1882–1904)
- Duchess Marie Louise of Mecklenburg (1883–1883), who died young.
- Duchess Marie Antoinette of Mecklenburg (1884–1944)
- Duke Henry Borwin of Mecklenburg (1885–1942), who married Elizabeth Tibbits Pratt. After her death in 1928, he married Natália Oelrichs. After her death in 1931, he married Karola Ernestine von Alers, a daughter of Wilhelm Karl Georg von Alers and Adelaide Marie Pauline Ernstine von Chamisso de Boncourt.
- Duke Joseph of Mecklenburg (1889–1889), who died young.

All of their children were raised as Roman Catholics, Marie's religion, and lived a quiet life in Venice, where they befriended Cardinal Sarto (later Pope Pius X), who often visited the family and acted as their spiritual advisor.

On 21 April 1884 Duke Paul Frederick deferred his and his sons' rights of succession to Mecklenburg-Schwerin in favour of his younger brothers and their sons, so they would take precedence over him and his. In 1887 her husband, raised a Lutheran, converted to Roman Catholicism, the religion of his wife and their common children.

In 1906, after raising the concerns of his nephew Frederick Francis IV, Grand Duke of Mecklenburg, about his expenses Duke Paul Frederick and his wife were ordered to submit expenditures to the comptroller of the royal household.

== Literature ==
- Viola Maier: Die Herzogin Marie von Mecklenburg-Schwerin (1856–1929). In: Julia K. Koch, Eva-Maria Mertens (eds.): Eine Dame zwischen 500 Herren. Johanna Mestorf, Werk und Wirkung (= Frauen, Forschung, Archäologie. Bd. 4). Waxmann, Münster etc., 2002, ISBN 3-8309-1066-5, pp. 257–265.
- Andrea Rottloff: Archäologen (= Die Berühmten). Philipp von Zabern, Mainz 2009, ISBN 978-3-8053-4063-2 pp. 87–89.
- Grewolls, Grete (2011). Wer war wer in Mecklenburg und Vorpommern. Das Personenlexikon (in German). Rostock: Hinstorff Verlag. p. 6319. ISBN 978-3-356-01301-6.
