= Paul Frederick, Grand Duke of Mecklenburg-Schwerin =

Grand Duke of Mecklenburg-Schwerin from 1837 to 1842

Paul Frederick
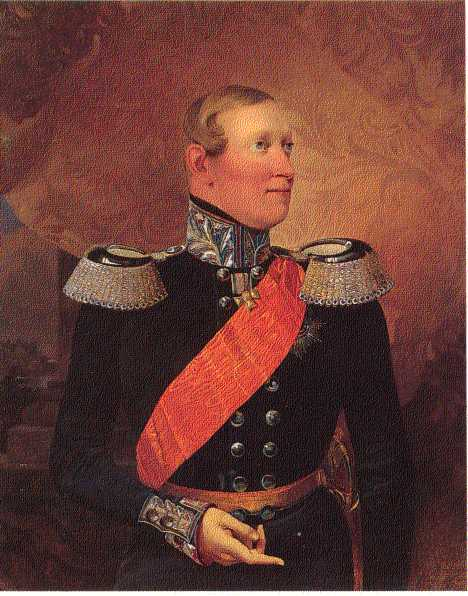

Grand Duke of Mecklenburg-Schwerin
- Reign: 1 February 1837 – 7 March 1842
- Predecessor: Frederick Francis I
- Successor: Frederick Francis II
- Born: 15 September 1800; Ludwigslust
- Died: 7 March 1842 (aged 41); Schwerin
- Spouse: Princess Alexandrine of Prussia (m. 1822)
- Issue: Frederick Francis II, Grand Duke of Mecklenburg-Schwerin; Louise, Hereditary Princess of Windisch-Graetz; Duke William of Mecklenburg-Schwerin
- House: House of Mecklenburg-Schwerin
- Father: Frederick Louis, Hereditary Grand Duke of Mecklenburg-Schwerin
- Mother: Grand Duchess Elena Pavlovna of Russia
- Religion: Lutheranism

Paul Friedrich (15 September 1800 – 7 March 1842) ruled as Grand Duke of Mecklenburg-Schwerin from 1837 to 1842.

== Early life ==
Paul Friedrich was born in Ludwigslust on 15 September 1800. He was the son of Friedrich Ludwig, Hereditary Grand Duke of Mecklenburg-Schwerin and Grand Duchess Elena Pavlovna of Russia. From his parents' marriage, he had a sister, Marie of Mecklenburg-Schwerin, who married Georg, Duke of Saxe-Altenburg. After his mother's death in 1803, his father married Princess Caroline Louise of Saxe-Weimar-Eisenach (daughter of Charles Augustus, Grand Duke of Saxe-Weimar-Eisenach) in 1810. Only one child survived to adulthood, his half-sister, Hélène of Mecklenburg-Schwerin, who married Prince Ferdinand Philippe, Duke of Orléans (eldest son of King Louis Philippe I of France). After Princess Caroline died in 1816, his father married her first cousin, Landgravine Auguste of Hesse-Homburg, who became stepmother to his surviving children.

His paternal grandparents were Frederick Francis I, Grand Duke of Mecklenburg-Schwerin, and Princess Louise of Saxe-Gotha-Altenburg. His maternal grandparents were Duchess Sophie Dorothea of Württemberg and Tsar Paul I of Russia; he was the only surviving grandchild born during the Tsar's lifetime.

He was educated at Geneva, Jena and Rostock. Upon the death of his father, the Hereditary Grand Duke, in 1819, Paul Friedrich became heir-apparent to the throne of Mecklenburg-Schwerin.

== Career ==
On 1 February 1837 he succeeded his grandfather, Friedrich Franz I. His reign saw improvements in the infrastructure and judicial system of the Grand Duchy, as well as a change in the government's seat of residence from Ludwigslust to Schwerin. Nonetheless, Paul Friedrich was largely interested only in military matters and spent most of his time drilling his troops. As Paul Friedrich reached his middle age, he adopted a more reclusive lifestyle, preferring only the company of his mistress.

== Personal life ==
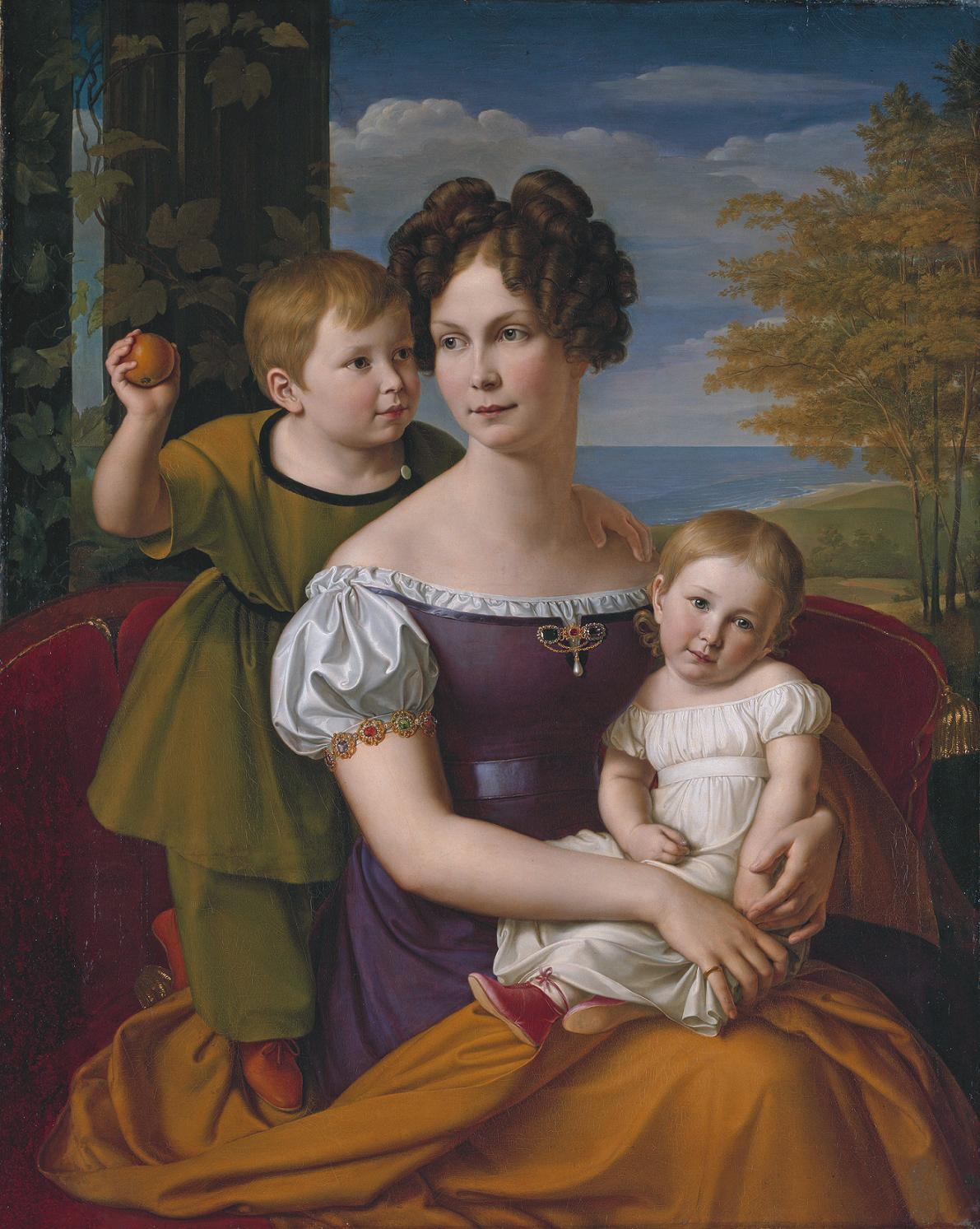
Portrait of his wife, Princess Alexandrine and children, Friedrich Franz II and Luise, by Friedrich Wilhelm Schadow, c. 1825

On 25 May 1822 at Berlin, Paul Friedrich married Princess Alexandrine of Prussia (1803–1892), the seventh child and fourth daughter of King Frederick William III of Prussia and Duchess Louise of Mecklenburg-Strelitz. Together, they had two sons and one daughter:

- Friedrich Franz II of Mecklenburg-Schwerin (1823–1883), who married Princess Augusta Reuss of Köstritz, a daughter of Prince Heinrich LXIII Reuss of Köstritz, and Countess Eleonore of Stolberg-Wernigerode, in 1849. After her death in 1862, he married Princess Anna of Hesse and by Rhine, the only daughter of Prince Karl of Hesse and by Rhine, and Princess Elisabeth of Prussia, in 1864. She died in 1865 and he married, thirdly, to Princess Marie of Schwarzburg-Rudolstadt, the daughter of Prince Adolph of Schwarzburg-Rudolstadt and Princess Mathilde of Schönburg-Waldenburg, in 1868.
- Duchess Luise of Mecklenburg-Schwerin (1824–1859), who married Hugo, 2nd Prince of Windisch-Graetz, second son of Weriand, 1st Prince of Windisch-Graetz. After her death in 1859, he married Princess Matilda Radziwill, the daughter of Prince Friedrich Wilhelm Radziwill, 14th Duke of Nieśwież (eldest son of Prince Antoni Radziwiłł), and Princess Mathilde Christina of Clary-Aldringen, in 1867.
- Duke Wilhelm of Mecklenburg-Schwerin (1827–1879), who married Princess Alexandrine of Prussia, daughter of Prince Albert of Prussia and Princess Marianne of the Netherlands.

Paul Friedrich also had issue with his mistress, Countess Catharina von Hauke, daughter of Johann Mauritz Hauke and sister of Princess Julia of Battenberg, including:

- Catharina (1830–1834), who died young.
- Paul Friedrich (1832–1903), who married Countess Maria Anna van Nieppell.
- Alexander (1833–1833), who died young.
- Helene Catharina (1835–1915), who died unmarried.

Paul Friedrich died in 1842 of a cold caught while rushing to a fire in his capital city.

=== Descendants ===
Through his daughter Luise, he was a grandfather of Hugo, 3rd Prince of Windisch-Graetz and Princess Marie of Windisch-Graetz.

== Ancestors ==
Ancestors of Paul Frederick, Grand Duke of Mecklenburg-Schwerin

8. Duke Louis of Mecklenburg-Schwerin
4. Frederick Francis I, Grand Duke of Mecklenburg-Schwerin
9. Princess Charlotte Sophie of Saxe-Coburg-Saalfeld
2. Frederick Louis, Hereditary Grand Duke of Mecklenburg-Schwerin
10. Prince John August of Saxe-Gotha-Altenburg
5. Princess Louise of Saxe-Gotha-Altenburg
11. Luise Reuss of Schleiz
1. Paul Frederick, Grand Duke of Mecklenburg-Schwerin
12. Peter III of Russia
6. Paul I of Russia
13. Catherine II of Russia
3. Grand Duchess Elena Pavlovna of Russia
14. Frederick II Eugene, Duke of Württemberg
7. Sophie Dorothea of Württemberg
15. Sophia Dorothea of Brandenburg-Schwedt

Paul Frederick, Grand Duke of Mecklenburg-Schwerin House of Mecklenburg-Schwerin Cadet branch of the House of Mecklenburg Born: 15 September 1800 Died: 7 March 1842
Regnal titles
Preceded by Friedrich Franz I	Grand Duke of Mecklenburg - Schwerin; 1837–1842	Succeeded by Friedrich Franz II
