= Alexandrine of Prussia, Grand Duchess of Mecklenburg-Schwerin =

Grand Duchess of Mecklenburg-Schwerin from 1837 to 1842

Alexandrine of Prussia
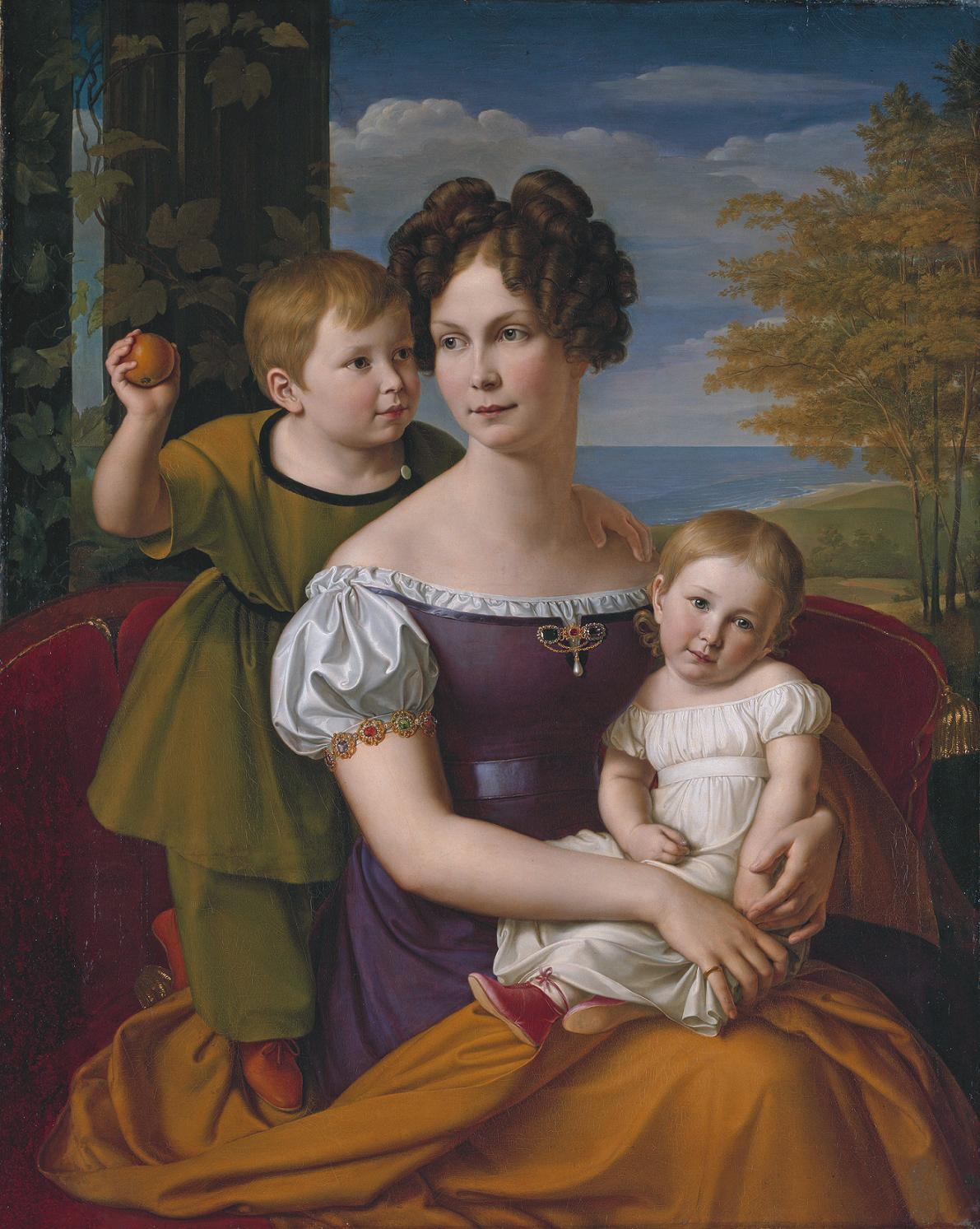
- Portrait c. 1825 by Friedrich Wilhelm Schadow of the Grand Duchess and two of her children, Frederick Francis and Louise

Grand Duchess consort of Mecklenburg-Schwerin
- Tenure: 1 February 1837 – 7 March 1842
- Born: 23 February 1803; Berlin, Prussia
- Died: 21 April 1892 (aged 89); Schwerin, Mecklenburg-Schwerin
- Spouse: Paul Frederick, Grand Duke of Mecklenburg-Schwerin (m. 1822; died 1842)
- Issue: Frederick Francis II, Grand Duke of Mecklenburg-Schwerin; Louise, Hereditary Princess of Windisch-Graetz; Duke William
Names
- Friederike Wilhelmine Alexandrine Marie Helene
- House: Hohenzollern
- Father: Frederick William III of Prussia
- Mother: Louise of Mecklenburg-Strelitz

Alexandrine of Prussia (Friederike Wilhelmine Alexandrine Marie Helene; 23 February 1803 – 21 April 1892) was Grand Duchess of Mecklenburg-Schwerin by marriage to Grand Duke Paul Frederick. She was the daughter of Frederick William III of Prussia and Louise of Mecklenburg-Strelitz.

== Early life ==
Born on 23 February 1803 in Prussia, Alexandrine was the seventh child and fourth daughter of King Frederick William III of Prussia and Duchess Louise of Mecklenburg-Strelitz.

== Grand Duchess consort of Mecklenburg-Schwerin ==
After rejecting a marriage proposal from the future King of Sweden, she married Paul Frederick of Mecklenburg-Schwerin on 25 May 1822. In 1837, Paul Frederick succeeded his grandfather as Grand Duke of Mecklenburg-Schwerin, making Alexandrine the Grand Duchess of Mecklenburg-Schwerin.

The marriage was generally considered unhappy; Paul Frederick was a military man who had little time for or interest in his wife and family. Alexandrine, by contrast, was a devoted mother who tenderly raised her children and actively cultivated their cultural pursuits. Alexandrine herself was very cultured but was also described as a stereotypically remote German princess. She was not considered an intellectual but attended scholarly lectures and read many books.

== Death and legacy ==
On 21 April 1892 in Schwerin, Alexandrine died at the age of 89. She was buried at the Schwerin Cathedral.

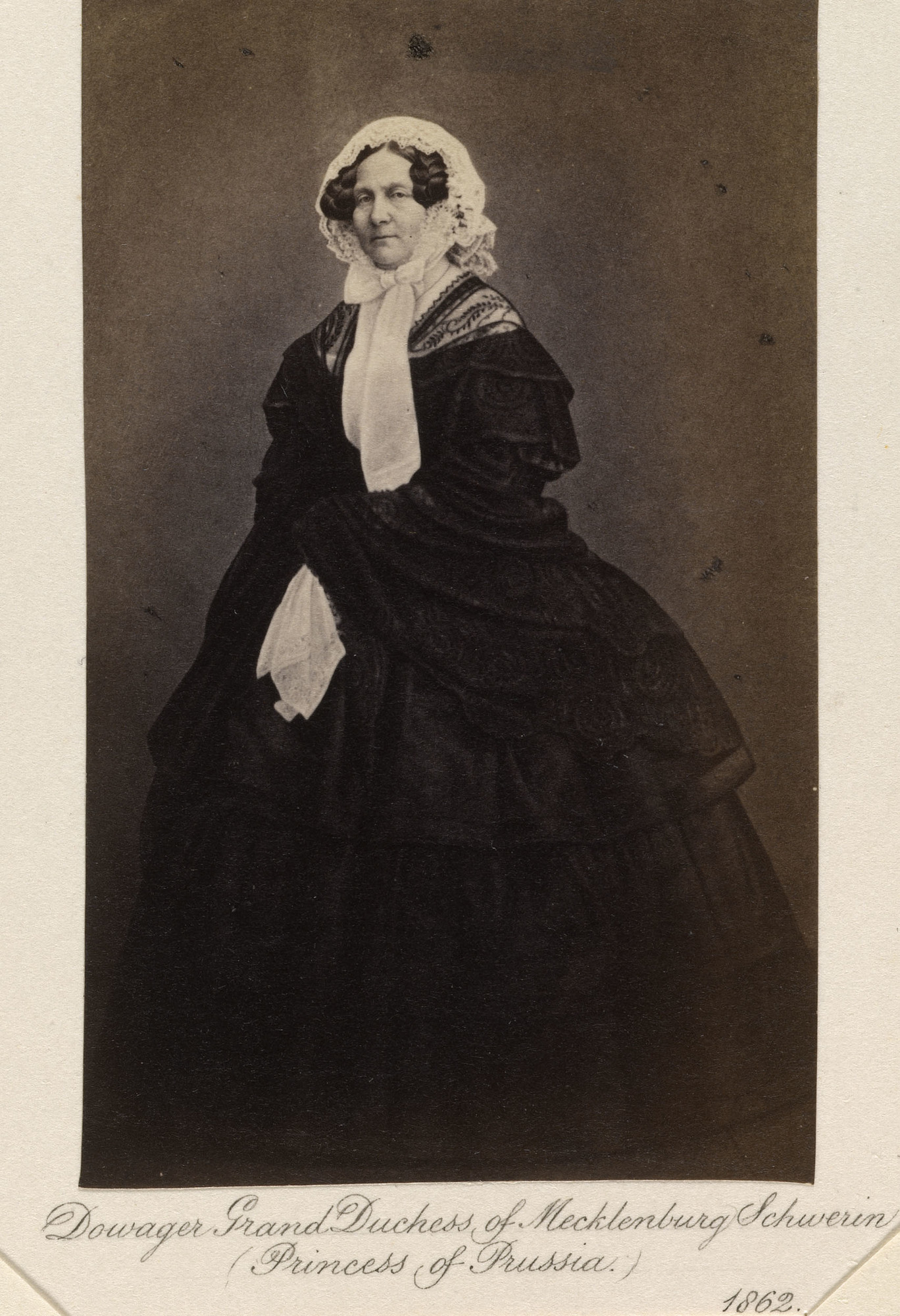
Alexandrine in 1862

At the time of her death, she was the last surviving grandchild of King Frederick William II of Prussia. She outlived all three of her children and would die in the reign of her grandson, Grand Duke Frederick Francis III.

She was described in the memoirs of her great-granddaughter Cecilie:

"She was loyal to the style of the 30s [1830s] until the day she died. [...] At the balls, concerts and dinners at the castle, the Dowager Grand Duchess was always the central figure; she had known the families of the assembled company for generations past and took an active and genuine interest in what happened to everyone. Every day she had a small circle of guests for luncheon; in the mornings she used to receive visitors. [...] She took up residence in her own Alexandrine Cottage. There, the dear old lady held her 'court', which means that there was a daily pilgrimage of everyone who thought it important to be counted among court society to bid goodmorning to the Dowager Grand Duchess. Afterwards, a donkey-cart would be brought out. Then there would begin a happy hour for those grandsons and granddaughters who were privileged to go out for a drive with their great-grandmother. My mother had arranged for the donkey-cart to be provided, when the old lady began to find it difficult to walk."

== Issue ==
- Frederick Francis II, Grand Duke of Mecklenburg-Schwerin (1823–1883)
- Luise (1824–1859) married Hugo, 2nd Hereditary Prince of Windisch-Graetz and had issue (Hugo, 3rd Prince of Windisch-Graetz and Princess Marie of Windisch-Graetz)
- Wilhelm (1827–1879) married Princess Alexandrine of Prussia, daughter of Prince Albert of Prussia

== Ancestry ==
Ancestors of Alexandrine of Prussia, Grand Duchess of Mecklenburg-Schwerin

8. Prince Augustus William of Prussia
4. Frederick William II of Prussia
9. Duchess Luise of Brunswick-Wolfenbüttel
2. Frederick William III of Prussia
10. Louis IX, Landgrave of Hesse-Darmstadt
5. Princess Frederica Louisa of Hesse-Darmstadt
11. Countess Palatine Caroline of Zweibrücken
1. Princess Alexandrine of Prussia
12. Duke Charles Louis Frederick of Mecklenburg-Strelitz
6. Charles II, Grand Duke of Mecklenburg-Strelitz
13. Princess Elisabeth Albertine of Saxe-Hildburghausen
3. Duchess Louise of Mecklenburg-Strelitz
14. Prince George William of Hesse-Darmstadt
7. Princess Friederike of Hesse-Darmstadt
15. Countess Maria Louise Albertine of Leiningen-Falkenburg-Dagsburg

Alexandrine of Prussia, Grand Duchess of Mecklenburg-Schwerin House of Hohenzollern Born: 23 February 1803 Died: 21 April 1892
German royalty
Vacant Title last held by Princess Louise of Saxe-Gotha-Altenburg as Duchess of Mecklenburg-Schwerin	Grand Duchess consort of Mecklenburg-Schwerin; 1 February 1837 – 7 March 1842	Vacant Title next held by Princess Augusta Reuss of Köstritz
