= Podsreda Castle =

Coordinates: 46.0279°N 15.5900°E

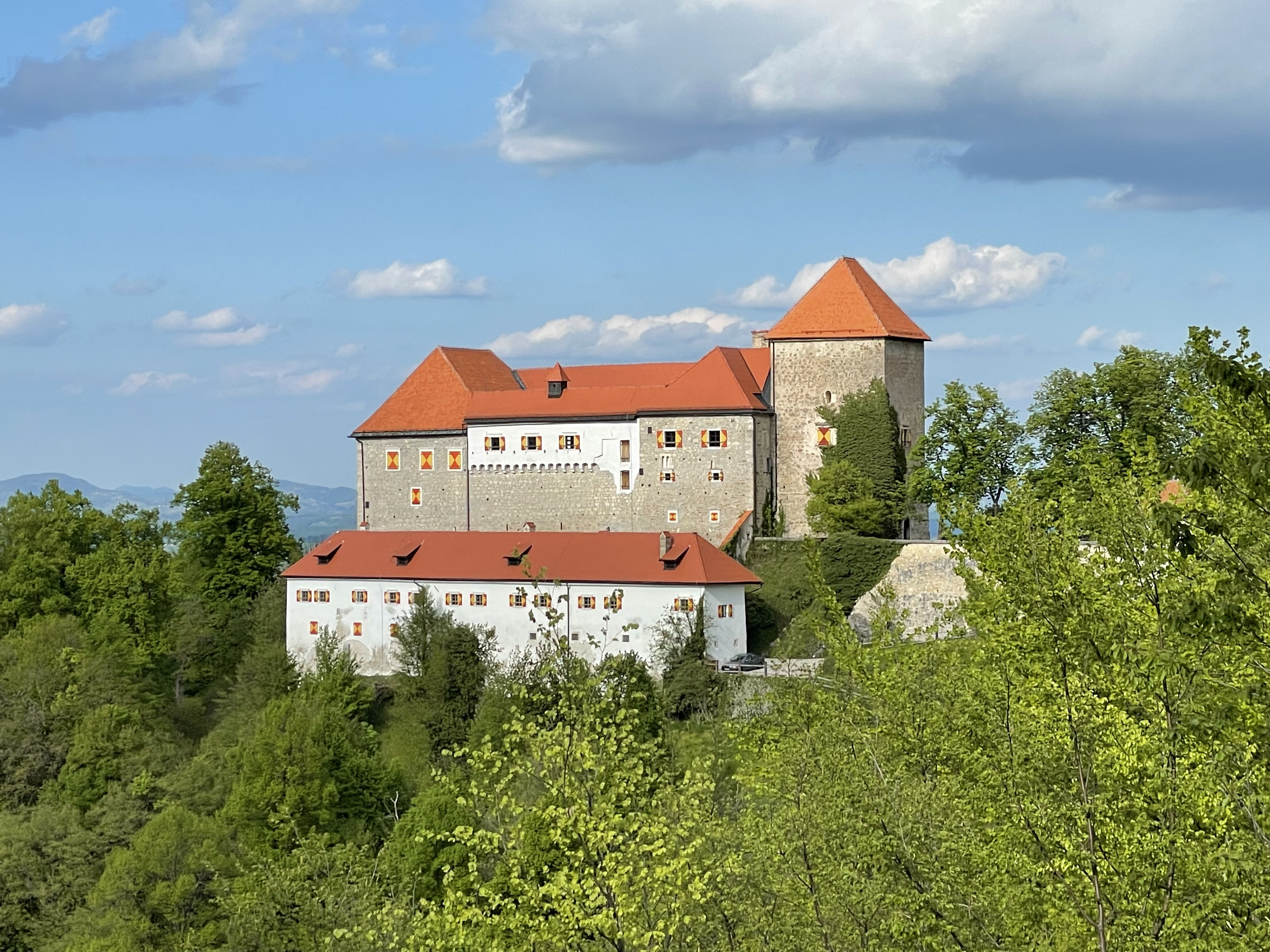
- Interactive map of Podsreda Castle

Podsreda Castle is a fortress in Slovenia with in the Kozje region. It was formerly known as Hörberg or Herberch. The castle contains a small chapel and a defense tower.

It was built in the 13th century. Then the castle was owned by the counts of Celje and the counts of Ptuj. During the Second World War the castle was nearly destroyed. However, since 1983 the castle has been under renovation by the Kozje Park Public Institute with renovations being completed in 2015.
