= Duke William of Mecklenburg-Schwerin =

Prussian general (1827–1879)

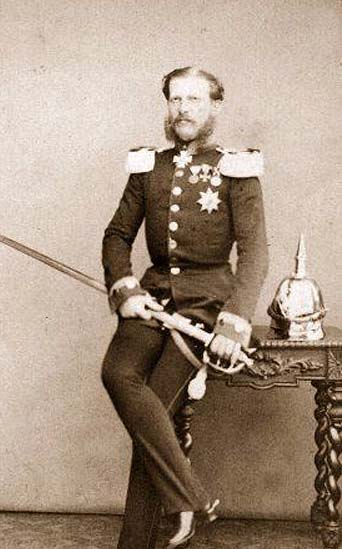
- Born: 5 March 1827; Ludwigslust
- Died: 28 July 1879 (aged 52); Heidelberg
- Spouse: Alexandrine of Prussia (m. 1865)
- Issue: Duchess Charlotte
Names
- English: Frederick William Nicholas; German: Friedrich Wilhelm Nicolas
- House: House of Mecklenburg-Schwerin
- Father: Paul Frederick, Grand Duke of Mecklenburg-Schwerin
- Mother: Alexandrine of Prussia

Duke Frederick William Nicholas of Mecklenburg-Schwerin (German: Friedrich Wilhelm Nicolas; 5 March 1827 – 28 July 1879) was the second son of Paul Frederick, Grand Duke of Mecklenburg-Schwerin, and Princess Alexandrine, daughter of King Frederick William III of Prussia.

== Life ==
He enlisted in the Prussian Army and became commander of the 6th (Brandenburg) Cuirassiers "Emperor Nicholas I of Russia". William had a reputation for drunkenness and a dissolute character. On two occasions he was deprived of his command in the Prussian army and he proposed marriage to the celebrated ballerina Marie Taglioni; consequently he was generally considered to be the "black sheep" of the family. Under family pressure, on 9 December 1865, he married Alexandrine of Prussia, daughter of his uncle Albert of Prussia and Marianne of Orange-Nassau. William settled with his wife at Bellevue Palace in Berlin. The marriage was unhappy and the couple had an only child: Charlotte (1868-1944) who married Prince Heinrich XVIII Reuss of Köstritz.

William took part in the Austro-Prussian War of 1866 as a major general in command of a cavalry brigade in the First Army. He managed, with difficulty, to secure a command in the Prussian Army during the Franco-Prussian War, leading the 6th Cavalry Division, but he was wounded on 9 September 1870 in Laon. As a result, he was long absent from the front and he showed a great lack of energy at the Battle of Le Mans. In 1873 he became commander of the 22nd Division in Kassel, completed in 1874 but it was only an honorary position. He died on 28 July 1879.

== Issue ==
By his wife, he had an only daughter:

- Duchess Charlotte of Mecklenburg-Schwerin (7 November 1868-20 December 1944). She married firstly Henry XVII of Reuss-Köstritz and secondly Robert Schmidt.

== Honours ==
He received the following orders and decorations:

- Mecklenburg:
  - Grand Cross of the Wendish Crown, with Crown in Ore and Collar
  - Military Merit Cross, 2nd and 1st Classes (Schwerin)
- Russian Empire:
  - Knight of St. Andrew
  - Knight of St. Alexander Nevsky
  - Knight of the White Eagle
  - Knight of St. Anna, 1st Class
- Austrian Empire: Grand Cross of the Imperial Order of Leopold, 1852
- Baden:
  - Knight of the House Order of Fidelity, 1849
  - Grand Cross of the Zähringer Lion, 1849
- Brunswick: Grand Cross of Henry the Lion
- (Saxe-Coburg and Gotha) (Duchy of Saxe-Altenburg) (Saxe-Meiningen) Ernestine duchies: Grand Cross of the Saxe-Ernestine House Order, October 1862
- Kingdom of Prussia:
  - Knight of the Black Eagle, 5 June 1844; with Collar, 1851
  - Knight of the Red Eagle, 1st Class, 5 June 1844; with Swords, 1849
  - Pour le Mérite (military), 20 September 1866
  - Iron Cross (1870), 1st and 2nd Classes
  - Grand Commander's Cross of the Royal House Order of Hohenzollern, with Swords, 16 June 1871
- Kingdom of Hanover: Grand Cross of the Royal Guelphic Order, 1847
- Oldenburg: Grand Cross of the Order of Duke Peter Friedrich Ludwig, with Golden Crown, 5 December 1865

== Ancestors ==
Ancestors of Duke William of Mecklenburg-Schwerin

16. Duke Louis of Mecklenburg-Schwerin
8. Frederick Francis I, Grand Duke of Mecklenburg-Schwerin
17. Princess Charlotte Sophie of Saxe-Coburg-Saalfeld
4. Frederick Louis, Hereditary Grand Duke of Mecklenburg-Schwerin
18. Prince John August of Saxe-Gotha-Altenburg
9. Princess Louise of Saxe-Gotha-Altenburg
19. Louise Reuss of Schleiz
2. Paul Frederick, Grand Duke of Mecklenburg-Schwerin
20. Peter III of Russia
10. Paul I of Russia
21. Catherine II of Russia
5. Grand Duchess Elena Pavlovna of Russia
22. Frederick II Eugene, Duke of Württemberg
11. Sophie Dorothea of Württemberg
23. Margravine Friederike of Brandenburg-Schwedt
1. Duke William of Mecklenburg-Schwerin
24. Prince Augustus William of Prussia
12. Frederick William II of Prussia
25. Duchess Luise of Brunswick-Wolfenbüttel
6. Frederick William III of Prussia
26. Louis IX, Landgrave of Hesse-Darmstadt
13. Frederika Louisa of Hesse-Darmstadt
27. Countess Palatine Caroline of Zweibrücken
3. Princess Alexandrine of Prussia
28. Duke Charles Louis Frederick of Mecklenburg
14. Charles II, Grand Duke of Mecklenburg-Strelitz
29. Princess Elisabeth Albertine of Saxe-Hildburghausen
7. Louise of Mecklenburg-Strelitz
30. Prince George William of Hesse-Darmstadt
15. Princess Friederike of Hesse-Darmstadt
31. Countess Maria Louise Albertine of Leiningen-Falkenburg-Dagsburg
