= Countess Marie Breuner-Enckevoirt =

Austrian aristocrat

Marie
- Princess of Hohenlohe-Schillingsfürst
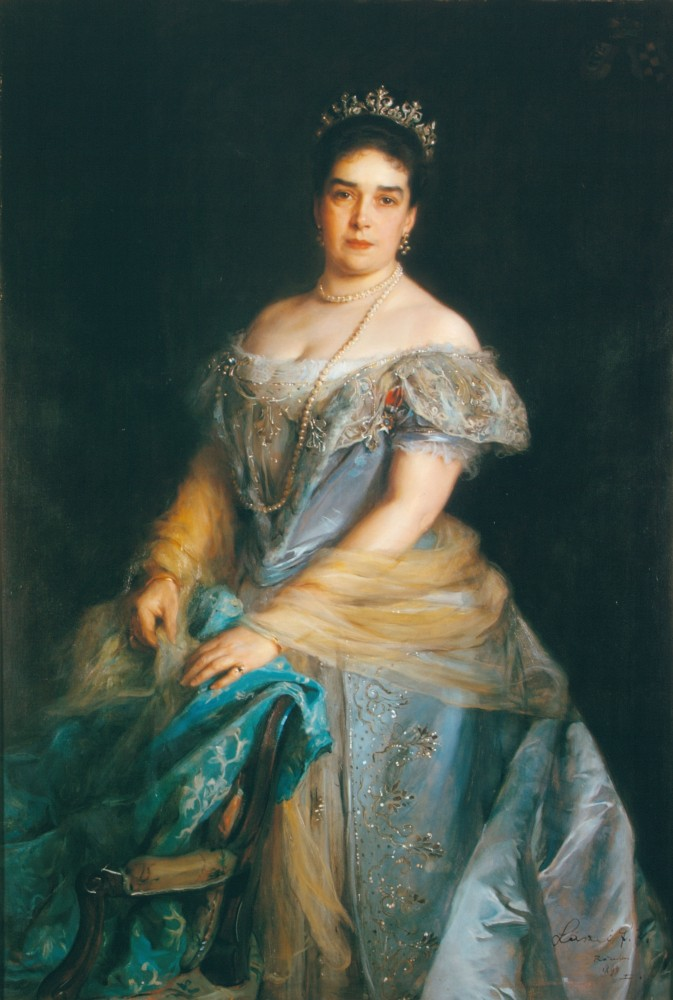
- Portrait of Duchess Marie by Philip de László, 1899

Duchess consort of Ratibor Princess consort of Corvey
- Tenure: 30 January 1893 – 9 August 1923
- Born: 23 August 1856; Grafenegg Castle, Krems-Land, Austrian Empire
- Died: 25 June 1929 (aged 72); Rudy Palace, Rudy, Second Polish Republic
- Spouse: Victor II, Duke of Ratibor (m. 1877; died 1923)
- Issue: Victor III, Duke of Ratibor; Prince Hans; Agathe, Princess Friedrich Wilhelm of Prussia; Princess Margarete
Names
- Marie Agathe Augusta Gobertina Hubertina
- House: Breuner-Enckevoirt
- Father: Count August Johann Breuner-Enckevoirt
- Mother: Countess Agota Széchényi de Sárvár-Felsövidék

Marie, Duchess of Ratibor, Princess of Corvey, Princess of Hohenlohe-Schillingsfürst (Marie Agathe Augusta Gobertina Hubertina; née Countess Marie (von) Breuner-Enckevoirt; 23 August 1856 – 25 June 1929) was an Austrian aristocrat and consort of Victor II, the last reigning Duke of Ratibor and Prince of Corvey.

== Early life and family ==
Countess Marie Breuner-Enckevoirt was born at Grafenegg Castle on 23 August 1856 to Count August Johann Breuner-Enckevoirt and Countess Agota Széchényi de Sárvár-Felsövidék. Her father was a member of the Austrian nobility. Her mother was from a Hungarian noble family. She was baptized as Maria Agathe Augusta Gobertina Hubertina in a Catholic ceremony the day after her birth. Her sister, Eleonore, was the wife of Karl Maria Alexander, 9th Prince of Auersperg. She was the aunt of Agathe Whitehead, the first wife of Georg von Trapp.

== Marriage and issue ==
On 19 June 1877, she married Prince Victor of Hohenlohe-Schillingsfürst, Duke of Ratibor and Prince of Corvey, in Vienna.

They had four children:

- Victor III, Duke of Ratibor (2 February 1879 – 11 November 1945); married in 1910 to Princess Elisabeth of Oettingen-Spielberg, had issue.
- Prince Hans of Hohenlohe-Schillingsfürst (8 March 1882 – 5 January 1948); married in 1918 to Princess Marie of Windisch-Graetz, no issue.
- Princess Agathe of Hohenlohe-Schillingsfürst (24 July 1888 – 12 December 1960); married in 1910 to Prince Friedrich Wilhelm of Prussia, had issue.
- Princess Margarete of Hohenlohe-Schillingsfürst (3 March 1894 – 23 May 1973); never married.

== Later life and death ==
In 1893 her husband succeeded his father, Victor I, as the Duke of Ratibor and Prince of Corvey. Her husband died on 9 August 1923.

She died on 25 June 1929 at Rauden Castle in Rudy, Upper Silesia.
