= Božidarević =

Albanian noble family

Božidarević Bosdarë
- Noble family
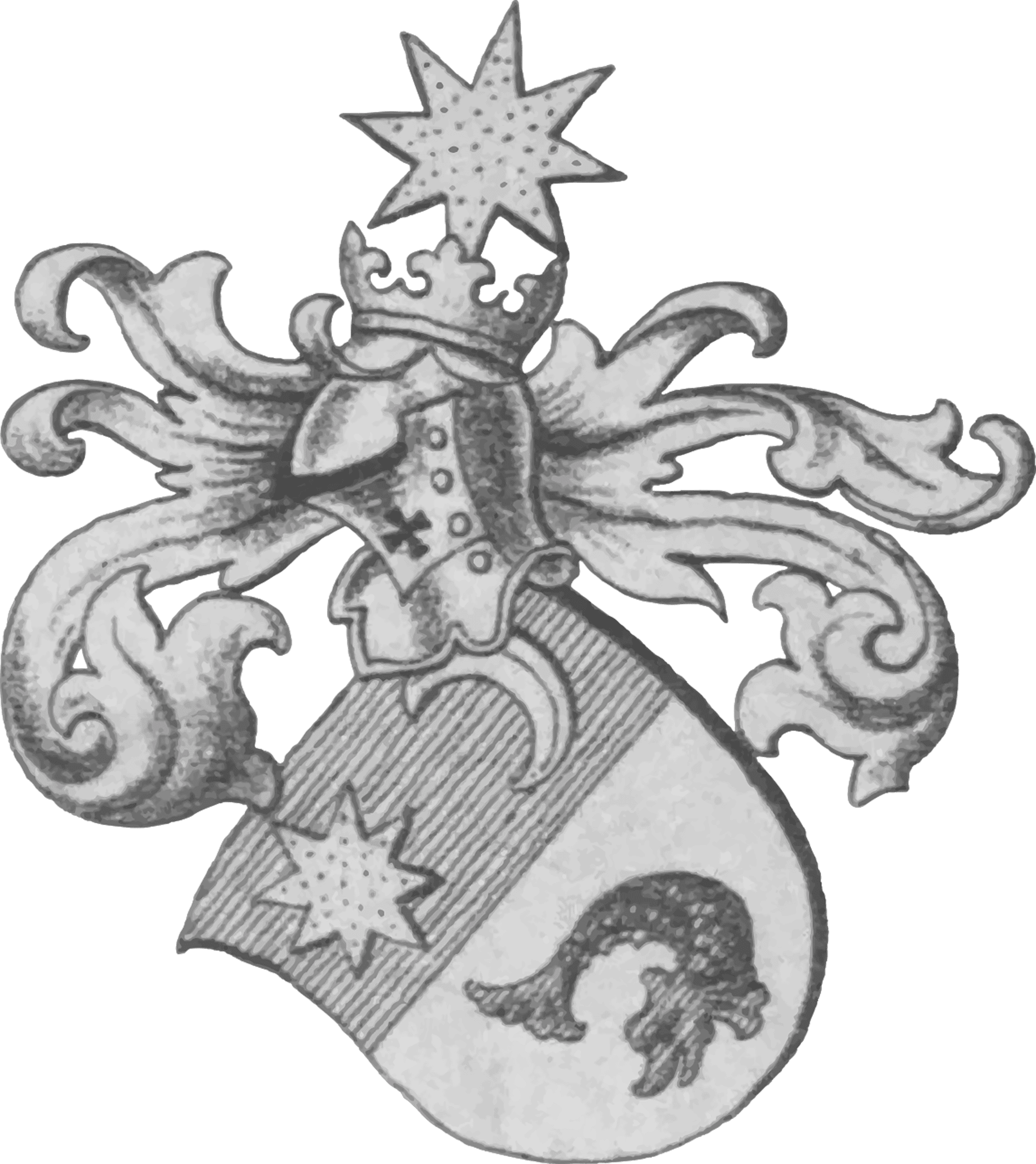
- Coat of Arms of the Bosdari family
- Origin: Albania
- Estates: Bologna; Ancona

The House of Božidarević (Albanian: Bosdarë; Italian: Bosdari) is a noble Ragusan family of Albanian origin dating from the Republic of Ragusa and Ancona, Italy.

== History ==
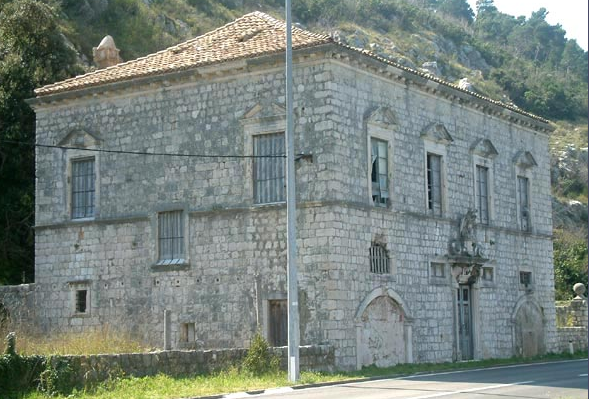
Bosdarë palace in Ragusa.

In 1450 the Bosdari family participated in the defense of Habsburg Croatia against the Ottoman Empire. They belonged to the list of late patriciate families of the Ragusan nobility. Biagio de Bosdari (*c.1635), son of Michele de Bosdari, was admitted to the council of Dubrovnik on 5 November 1666, who contributed with 5,000 ducats to the Republic treasury. On 30 July 1667 Božidar de Bosdari was admitted to the council of Ragusa as a token of gratitude for community service in the period after the earthquake.

== Bosdari of Ancona ==
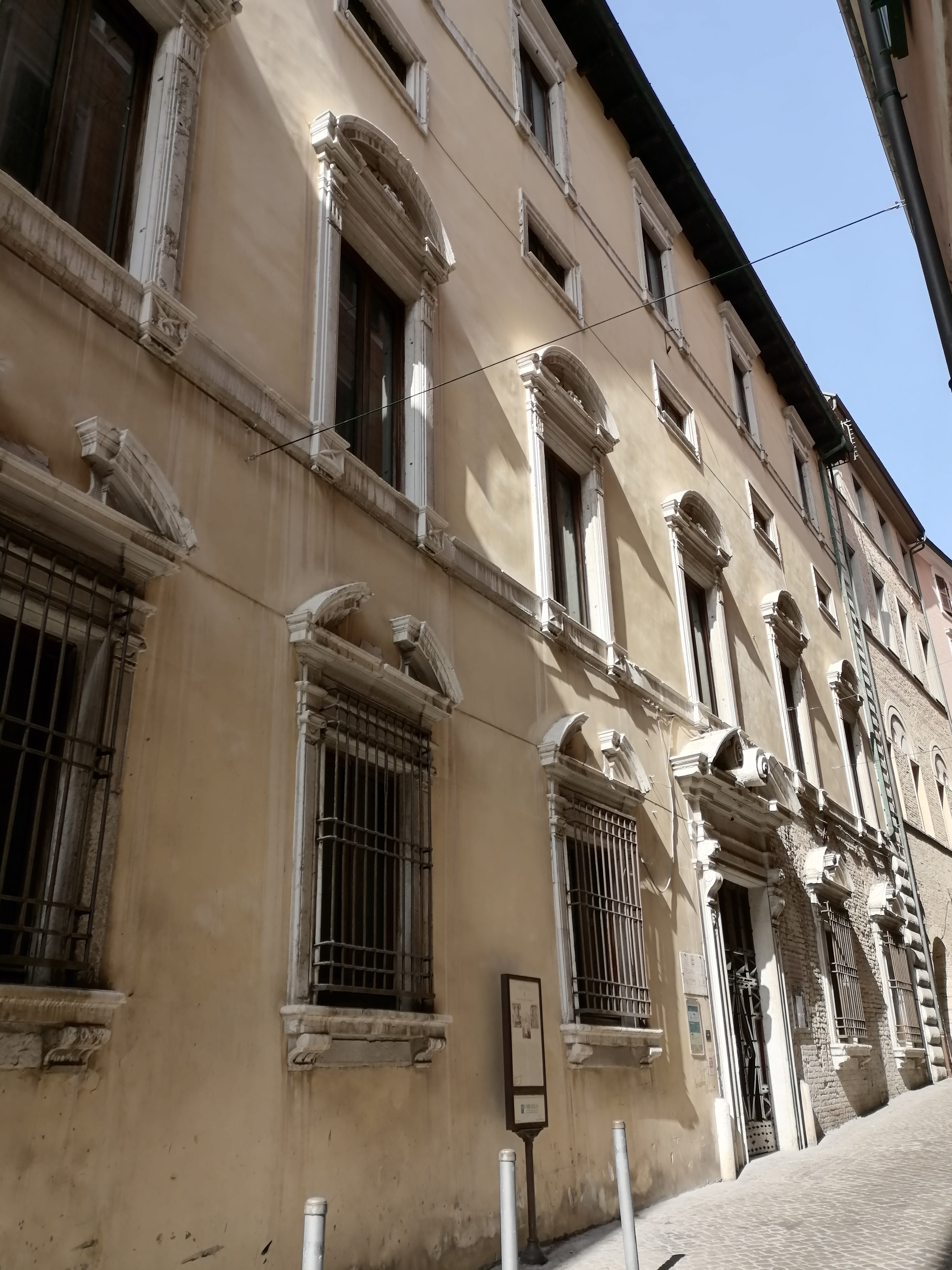
Bosdarë palace in Ancona.

The brother of Vlaho, Frano, moved to Ancona, founding the Ancona branch of the family with the name Bosdari. An Imperial Diploma of 4 July 1753 created the Bosdari of Ancona nobles. The family later moved to Bologna.

== See also ==
- Republic of Ragusa
- Dubrovnik
- Dalmatia
- Post-Roman patriciates

== Sources ==
- Historical Encyclopedia Nobiliare, Milan 1929, vol. II, pp. 152-153
