= Wilhelm I of Auersperg =

Wilhelm I
- Prince of Auersperg; Duke of Gottschee
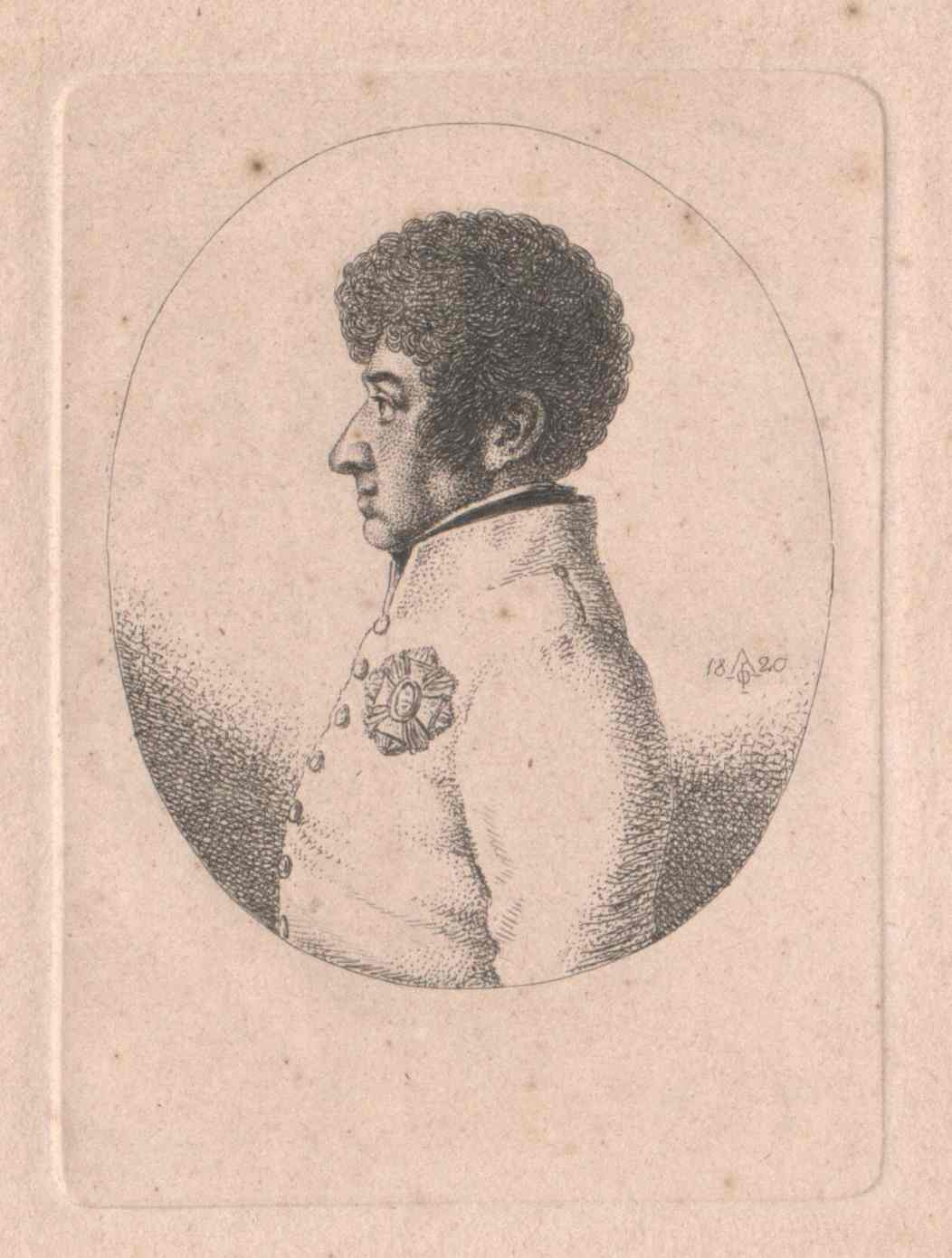

Prince of Auersperg
- Period: 2 October 1800 – 16 March 1822
- Predecessor: Karl Josef
- Successor: Wilhelm II
- Born: 9 August 1749; Graz, Duchy of Styria, Holy Roman Empire
- Died: 16 March 1822 (aged 72); Sopron, Kingdom of Hungary
- Spouse: Countess Leopoldine of Waldstein-Wartenberg (died 1822)
- Issue: Wilhelm II of Auersperg
- House: Auersperg
- Father: Karl Josef, Prince of Auersperg
- Mother: Countess Maria Josepha Rosa Trautson

Wilhelm I von Auersperg (9 August 1749 – 16 March 1822), was the 6th Prince of Auersperg and Duke of Gottschee. During his reign, the Principality of Auersperg was mediatised to the Grand Duchy of Baden.

== Early life ==
Wilhelm was born on 9 August 1749 in Graz in the Duchy of Styria, which was a state in the Holy Roman Empire. He was the son of Karl Josef Anton, 5th Prince of Auersperg (1720–1800) Countess Maria Josepha Trautson von Falkenstein (1724–1792).

His paternal grandparents were Heinrich Joseph Johann of Auersperg, 4th Prince of Auersperg, and, his first wife, Princess Marie Dominika of Liechtenstein (a daughter of Hans-Adam I, Prince of Liechtenstein and Countess Erdmuthe Maria Theresia of Dietrichstein). After his grandmother's death in 1726, his grandfather married Countess Maria Franziska Trautson of Falkenstein (a daughter of Prince Johann Leopold Trautson von Falkenstein), with whom he had nine more children, including Joseph Franz von Auersperg, Prince-Bishop of Passau. His maternal grandparents were Count Johann Wilhelm Trautson von Falkenstein and Countess Maria Anna Josepha Ungnad (a daughter of Count Franz Anton Ungnad von Weißendorf).

== Career ==
Upon the death of his father on 2 October 1800, he became the reigning Prince of the Principality of Auersperg and the Duke of Gottschee (which Emperor Leopold II had elevated the territory to the Duchy of Gottschee for his father in 1791). Following the dissolution of the Holy Roman Empire in 1806, the Imperial State of Auersperg was mediatised to the Grand Duchy of Baden.

Gottschee, however, became part of the Napoleonic French Empire during the short-lived period of the Illyrian Provinces. Under this arrangement it was initially part of the province of Ljubljana from 1809 to 1811, and then the province of Carniola from 1811 to 1814, and constituted a separate administrative canton. The Gottscheers revolted against French rule during the 1809 Gottscheer Rebellion, killing the commissar of the Novo Mesto district, Von Gasparini. With the collapse of the Illyrian provinces, Gottschee was returned to Habsburg rule within the Kingdom of Illyria.

== Personal life ==
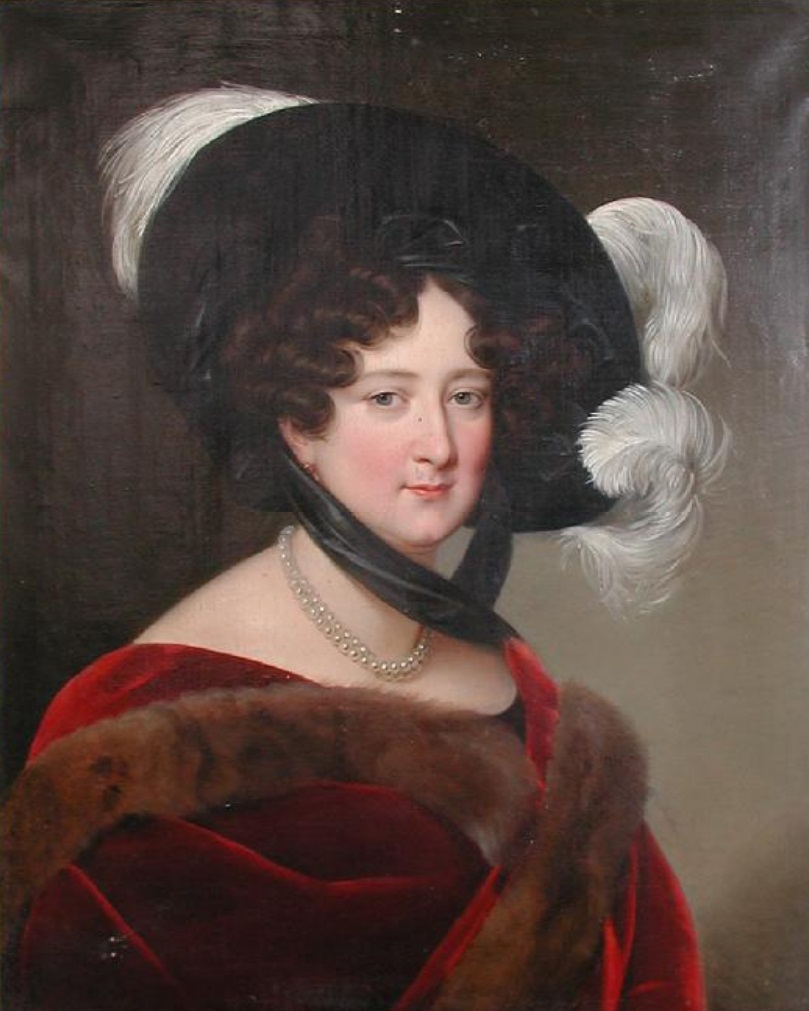
Portrait of his daughter-in-law, Marie Gabrielle von Lobkowicz, by Franz Schrotzberg, 1843

Auersperg was married to Countess Leopoldine von Waldstein-Wartenberg (1761–1846), a daughter of Johann Vincenz Ferreris, Count of Waldstein, Lord of Wartenberg, and Countess Anna Sophia Marie von Sternberg. Together, they were the parents of:

- Maria Josepha von Auersperg (1777–1811), who married Johann Baptista Maria van Goethem de St. Agathe.
- Henriette von Auersperg (1778–1781), who died young.
- Marie Sophie von Auersperg (1780–1865), who married Count Josef Chotek von Chotkow und Wognin, second son of Johann Rudolf, Count Chotek of Chotkow and Wognin, in 1802.
- Karl Wilhelm II von Auersperg (1782–1827), who married Countess Adelheid zu Windisch-Grätz, a daughter of Count Joseph Nicholas of Windisch-Graetz. After her death in 1806, he married Friedrike Luise von Lenthe, a daughter of Carl Levin Otto von Lenthe and Henriette Friederike Wilhelmine Sophie Bennigsen von Banteln (a daughter of Count Levin August von Bennigsen).
- Carl Wilhelm Johann Nepomuk von Auersperg (1783–1847), who married Auguste Eleonore Elisabeth Antonie von Lenthe, also a daughter of Carl Levin Otto von Lenthe.
- Maria Theresia von Auersperg (1784–1819)
- Vincenz Nepomuk Columban von Auersperg (1790–1812), who married Marie Gabrielle von Lobkowicz, eldest daughter of Joseph Franz, 7th Prince of Lobkowicz.

The Prince died on 16 March 1822 in Sopron in the Kingdom of Hungary on the Austrian border, near Lake Neusiedl.

Titles of nobility
Preceded by Karl Josef Anton of Auersperg	Prince of Auersperg; 1800–1822	Succeeded by Wilhelm II of Auersperg
