= Frederick Francis II =

Grand Duke of Mecklenburg-Schwerin from 1842 to 1883

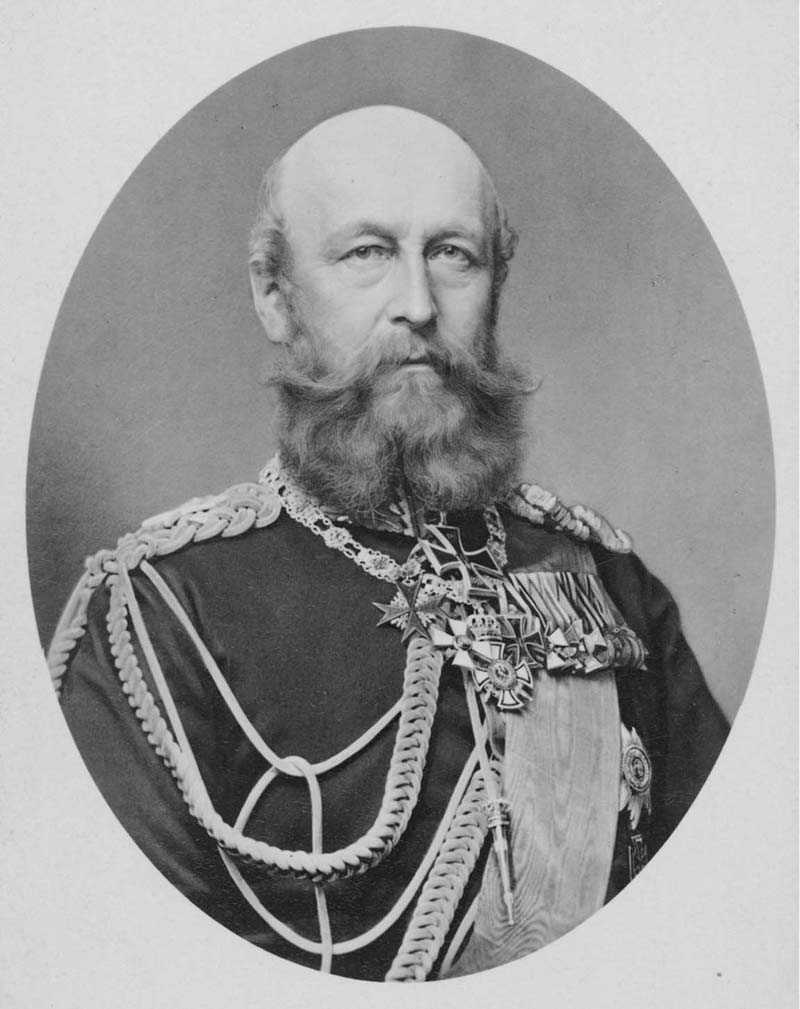

Grand Duke of Mecklenburg-Schwerin
- Reign: 7 March 1842 – 15 April 1883
- Predecessor: Paul Frederick
- Successor: Frederick Francis III
- Born: 28 February 1823; Ludwigslust Palace, Grand Duchy of Mecklenburg-Schwerin, German Confederation
- Died: 15 April 1883 (aged 60); Schwerin, Mecklenburg-Schwerin, Germany
- Spouse: Princess Augusta Reuss of Köstritz (m. 1849; died 1862) Princess Anna of Hesse and by Rhine (m. 1864; died 1865) Princess Marie of Schwarzburg-Rudolstadt (m. 1868)
- Issue: Frederick Francis III, Grand Duke of Mecklenburg-Schwerin; Duke Paul Frederick; Grand Duchess Maria Pavlovna of Russia; Duke Nikolaus; Duke John Albert; Duke Alexander; Duchess Anna; Elisabeth, Grand Duchess of Oldenburg; Duke Friedrich William; Duke Adolf Friedrich; Henry, Prince Consort of the Netherlands
- House: Mecklenburg-Schwerin
- Father: Paul Frederick, Grand Duke of Mecklenburg-Schwerin
- Mother: Princess Alexandrine of Prussia
- Religion: Lutheran
- Military career
- Branch: Prussian Army
- Conflicts: Franco-Prussian War; • Battle of Loigny–Poupry; • Battle of Beaugency

Frederick Francis II (German: Friedrich Franz II; 28 February 1823 – 15 April 1883) was a Prussian officer and Grand Duke of Mecklenburg-Schwerin from 7 March 1842 until 15 April 1883.

== Biography ==
He was born in Schloss Ludwigslust, the eldest son of Hereditary Grand Duke Paul Friedrich of Mecklenburg-Schwerin and Princess Alexandrine of Prussia. He became heir apparent to the grand duchy following the death of his great-grandfather Frederick Francis I on 1 February 1837. Frederick Francis was privately educated until 1838. He then attended the Blochmann institute in Dresden before going to the University of Bonn. Frederick Francis succeeded his father as Grand Duke on 7 March 1842.

During the Second Schleswig War, Frederick Francis served on the staff of Generalfeldmarschall Friedrich Graf von Wrangel, having refused a command in the fight against Denmark since Christian IX of Denmark was a close friend. During the Austro-Prussian War he commanded the forces that occupied Leipzig and lay siege to Nuremberg. He also took part in the Franco-Prussian War, during which he was made Governor-General of Reims and commanded the German forces laying siege to Toul. He defended the Prussian forces during the Siege of Paris from attack by the Army of the Loire. He defeated French forces at the battles of Beaune-La-Rolande and Beaugency. He was the maternal first cousin of both German Emperor Frederick III and Russian Tsar Alexander II. He held the rank of Prussian general and was also a Russian General Field Marshal.

Frederick Francis died on 15 April 1883 in Schwerin and was succeeded as Grand Duke by his eldest son, Frederick Francis III.

== Marriages and children ==
Frederick Francis was first married to Princess Augusta Reuss of Köstritz (26 May 1822 – 3 March 1862) on 3 November 1849 in Ludwigslust. They had six children:

- Frederick Francis III, Grand Duke of Mecklenburg-Schwerin (19 March 1851 – 10 April 1897) he married Grand Duchess Anastasia Mikhailovna of Russia on 24 January 1879. They had three children.
- Duke Paul Frederick of Mecklenburg-Schwerin (19 September 1852 – 17 May 1923) he married Princess Marie of Windisch-Graetz on 5 May 1881. They had five children.
- Duchess Marie of Mecklenburg-Schwerin (14 May 1854 – 5 September 1920) she married Grand Duke Vladimir Alexandrovich of Russia on 28 August 1874. They had five children.
- Duke Nikolaus of Mecklenburg-Schwerin (18 August 1855 – 23 January 1856) died at 5 months old.
- Duke Johann Albrecht of Mecklenburg-Schwerin (8 December 1857 – 16 February 1920) he married Princess Elisabeth Sybille of Saxe-Weimar-Eisenach (28 February 1854 – 10 July 1908) on 6 November 1886. He remarried Princess Elisabeth of Stolberg-Rossla on 15 December 1909.
- Duke Alexander of Mecklenburg-Schwerin (13 August 1859 – 13 August 1859)

Frederick Francis married for a second time in Darmstadt to Princess Anna of Hesse and by Rhine (25 May 1843 – 16 April 1865) on 4 July 1864. They had one daughter:

- Duchess Anna of Mecklenburg-Schwerin (7 April 1865 – 8 February 1882) died at the age of 16.

His third wife was Princess Marie of Schwarzburg-Rudolstadt on 4 July 1868. They had four children:

- Duchess Elisabeth Alexandrine of Mecklenburg-Schwerin (10 August 1869 – 3 September 1955) she married Frederick Augustus II, Grand Duke of Oldenburg on 24 October 1896. They had five children.
- Duke Friedrich Wilhelm of Mecklenburg-Schwerin (5 April 1871 – 22 September 1897) died at the age of 26.
- Duke Adolf Friedrich of Mecklenburg-Schwerin (10 October 1873 – 5 August 1969) he married Princess Viktoria Feodora of Reuss zu Schleiz (21 April 1889 – 18 December 1918) on 24 April 1917. They had one daughter Duchess Woizlawa Feodora of Mecklenburg-Schwerin (1918–2019), later Princess Reuß zu Köstritz. After the death of his first wife, Adolf Friedrich remarried Princess Elisabeth of Stolberg-Rossla on 15 October 1924.
- Duke Heinrich of Mecklenburg-Schwerin (19 April 1876 – 3 July 1934) he married Queen Wilhelmina of the Netherlands on 7 February 1901. They had one daughter: Queen Juliana.

== Honours ==
German decorations

- Mecklenburg:
  - Grand Cross of the Wendish Crown, with Crown in Ore and Collar
  - Founder of the Military Merit Cross, 5 August 1848 (Schwerin)
- Anhalt: Grand Cross of the Order of Albert the Bear, with Swords, 19 September 1864
- Baden:
  - Knight of the House Order of Fidelity, 1844
  - Grand Cross of the Zähringer Lion, 1844
  - Grand Cross of the Military Karl-Friedrich Merit Order, 1871
- Bavaria:
  - Knight of St. Hubert, 1856
  - Grand Cross of the Military Order of Max Joseph
- Brunswick: Grand Cross of the Order of Henry the Lion
- (Saxe-Coburg and Gotha) (Duchy of Saxe-Altenburg) (Saxe-Meiningen) Ernestine duchies: Grand Cross of the Saxe-Ernestine House Order, May 1840
- Hanover:
  - Knight of St. George, 1842
  - Grand Cross of the Royal Guelphic Order, 1842
- Hesse-Darmstadt: Grand Cross of the Ludwig Order, 25 December 1843
- Hesse-Kassel: Knight of the Golden Lion, 14 March 1864
- Nassau: Knight of the Gold Lion of Nassau, July 1858
- Oldenburg: Grand Cross of the Order of Duke Peter Friedrich Ludwig, with Golden Crown, 8 October 1843; with Swords, 31 December 1870
- Saxe-Weimar-Eisenach: Grand Cross of the White Falcon, 16 February 1840; with Swords, 1871
- Saxony: Knight of the Rue Crown, 1842
- Prussia:
  - Knight of the Black Eagle, 9 January 1840; with Collar, 1851
  - Knight of the Red Eagle, 1st Class, 9 January 1840; with Swords, 1864
  - Commander of Honour of the Johanniter Order, 1863
  - Grand Commander's Cross of the Royal House Order of Hohenzollern, 9 December 1865; with Swords, 1871
  - Pour le Mérite (military), 9 August 1866; with Oak Leaves, 5 December 1870
  - Grand Cross of the Iron Cross, 4 December 1871
- Württemberg:
  - Grand Cross of the Military Merit Order, 30 December 1870
  - Grand Cross of the Württemberg Crown, 1871

Foreign decorations

- Austrian Empire: Grand Cross of the Royal Hungarian Order of St. Stephen, 1844
- Denmark: Knight of the Elephant, 5 April 1842
- Kingdom of Greece: Grand Cross of the Redeemer
- Kingdom of Italy: Knight of the Annunciation, 6 June 1870
- Netherlands: Grand Cross of the Gold Lion of Nassau
- Ottoman Empire: Order of Osmanieh, 1st Class
- Kingdom of Portugal: Grand Cross of the Tower and Sword
- Russian Empire:
  - Knight of St. Andrew
  - Knight of St. Alexander Nevsky
  - Knight of the White Eagle
  - Knight of St. Anna, 1st Class
- Spain: Grand Cross of the Order of Charles III, 24 September 1865

== Ancestors ==
Ancestors of Frederick Francis II

8. Frederick Francis I, Grand Duke of Mecklenburg-Schwerin
4. Frederick Louis, Hereditary Grand Duke of Mecklenburg-Schwerin
9. Princess Louise of Saxe-Gotha-Altenburg
2. Paul Frederick, Grand Duke of Mecklenburg-Schwerin
10. Paul I of Russia
5. Grand Duchess Elena Pavlovna of Russia
11. Sophie Dorothea of Württemberg
1. Frederick Francis II, Grand Duke of Mecklenburg-Schwerin
12. Frederick William II of Prussia
6. Frederick William III of Prussia
13. Frederika Louisa of Hesse-Darmstadt
3. Princess Alexandrine of Prussia
14. Charles II of Mecklenburg-Strelitz
7. Louise of Mecklenburg-Strelitz
15. Princess Friederike of Hesse-Darmstadt

Frederick Francis II House of Mecklenburg-Schwerin Cadet branch of the House of Mecklenburg Born: 28 February 1823 Died: 15 April 1883
Regnal titles
Preceded by Paul Frederick	Grand Duke of Mecklenburg-Schwerin; 1842–1883	Succeeded by Frederick Francis III
