= Princess Augusta Reuss of Köstritz =

Grand Duchess of Mecklenburg-Schwerin from 1849 to 1862

Princess Augusta
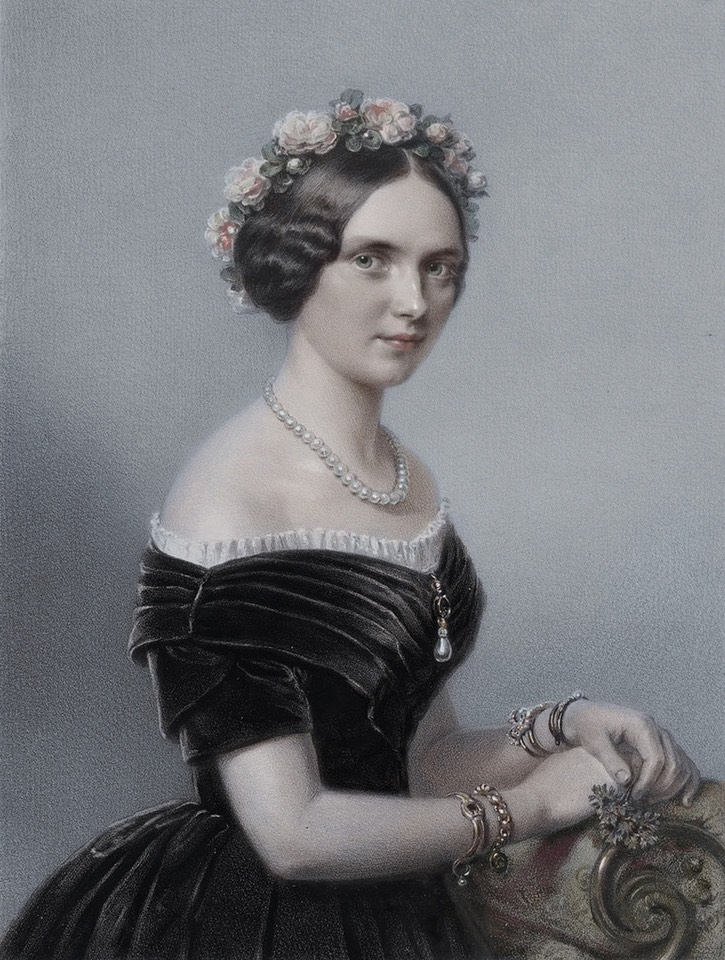

Grand Duchess consort of Mecklenburg-Schwerin
- Tenure: 3 November 1849 – 3 March 1862
- Born: 26 May 1822; Klipphausen, Kingdom of Saxony
- Died: 3 March 1862 (aged 39); Schwerin, Mecklenburg-Schwerin
- Burial: Schwerin Castle
- Spouse: Frederick Francis II (m. 1849)
- Issue: Frederick Francis III; Duke Paul Frederick; Grand Duchess Maria Pavlovna of Russia; Duke Nikolaus; Duke John Albert; Duke Alexander
- House: Reuss Junior Line
- Father: Heinrich LXIII, Prince Reuss of Köstritz
- Mother: Countess Eleonore of Stolberg-Wernigerode

Princess Augusta Reuss of Köstritz (Auguste Mathilde Wilhelmine Reuß; 26 May 1822 – 3 March 1862) was Grand Duchess of Mecklenburg-Schwerin, as the first wife of Frederick Francis II, Grand Duke of Mecklenburg-Schwerin.

== Early life ==
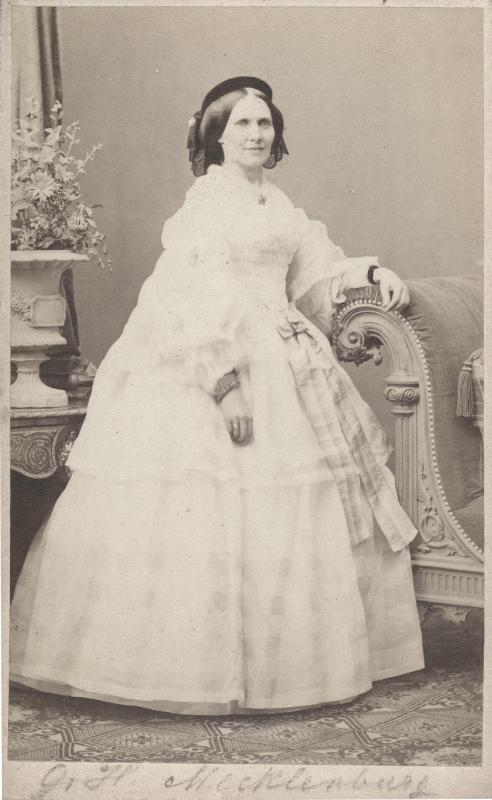
Grand Duchess Augusta in 1861

Princess Augusta, third child and second daughter of Prince Heinrich LXIII Reuss of Köstritz and his first wife, Countess Eleonore of Stolberg-Wernigerode, was born at Klipphausen, Kingdom of Saxony.

Her family, the Reuss zu Köstritz branch of the House of Reuss, belonged to its Junior line.

== Marriage ==
On 3 November 1849, in Ludwigslust, Augusta married Frederick Francis II, Grand Duke of Mecklenburg-Schwerin son of Grand Duke Paul Frederick. Together they had six children.

- Frederick Francis III (1851–1897) father of Alexandrine, Queen of Denmark and Cecile, last Crown Princess of Prussia.
- Paul Friedrich (1852–1923) married Princess Marie of Windisch-Grätz.
- Marie (1854–1920) married Grand Duke Vladimir Alexandrovich of Russia. Their son Cyril became pretender to the Russian throne after the assassination of his cousin Nicholas II of Russia.
- Nikolaus (1855–1856).
- John Albert (1857–1920) Imperial regent of the Duchy of Brunswick; married firstly to Princess Elisabeth Sybille of Saxe-Weimar-Eisenach; second marriage to Princess Elisabeth of Stolberg-Rossla.
- Duke Alexander (1859–1859).

== Death ==
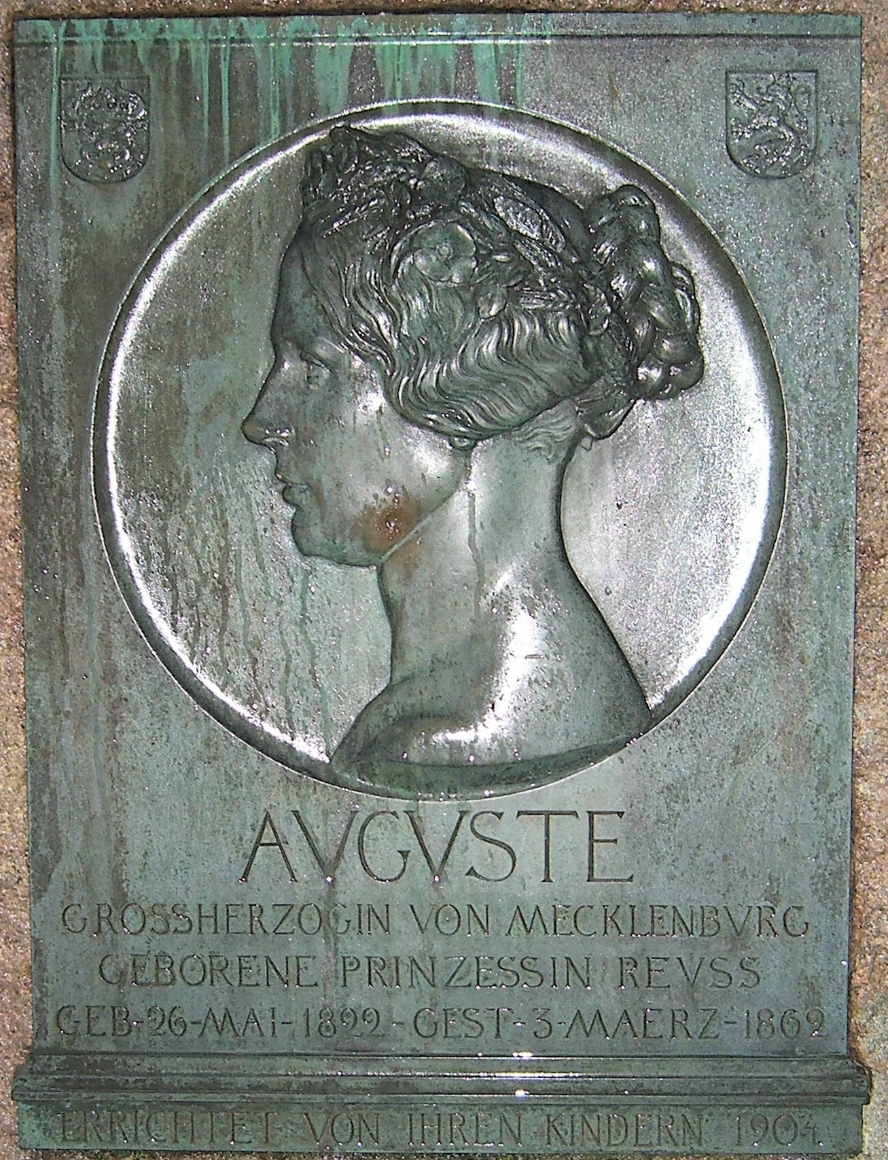
Augusta Memorial at Schwerin

Augusta's early death raised some questions in the court. It was said that Augusta died of "bronchial problems associated with heart disease". One biographer said she died of a type of fever.

Augusta was buried in the gardens of Schwerin Castle and by 1905, a memorial portrait was built by sculptor Wilhelm Wandschneider.

== Ancestry ==
Ancestors of Princess Augusta Reuss of Köstritz

8. Heinrich IX, Count Reuss of Köstritz
4. Heinrich XLIV, Prince Reuss of Köstritz
9. Countess Amalie von Wartensleben und Flodroff
2. Heinrich LXIII, Prince Reuss of Köstritz
10. Baron Friedrich Christian von Geuder genannt Rabensteiner
5. Baroness Wilhelmine von Geuder genannt Rabensteiner
11. Johanna von Bredow
1. Princess Augusta Reuss of Köstritz
12. Count Christian Frederick of Stolberg-Wernigerode
6. Count Heinrich of Stolberg-Wernigerode
13. Countess Auguste of Stolberg-Stolberg
3. Countess Eleonore of Stolberg-Wernigerode
14. Prince Otto Karl Friedrich of Schonburg-Waldenburg
7. Princess Johanna of Schonburg-Waldenburg
15. Countess Henriette Eleonore Elisabeth Reuss-Köstritz

Princess Augusta Reuss of Köstritz House of Reuss-Köstritz Cadet branch of the House of Reuss Born: 26 May 1822 Died: 3 March 1862
German royalty
Vacant Title last held by Princess Alexandrine of Prussia	Grand Duchess consort of Mecklenburg-Schwerin; 3 November 1849 – 3 March 1862	Vacant Title next held by Princess Anna of Hesse and by Rhine
