= Alfred III, Prince of Windisch-Grätz =

Austro-Hungarian statesman, 11th Minister-President of Austria

Durchlaucht Alfred August, Fürst zu Windischgraetz
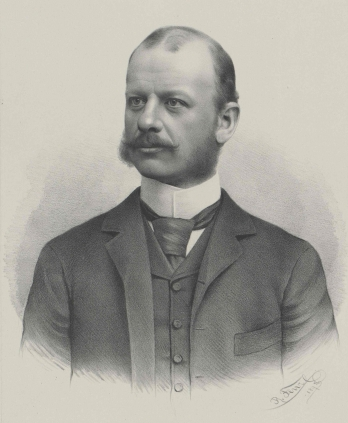
- Prince Alfred August of Windischgraetz in 1893

Minister-President of Austria
- In office 11 November 1893 – 19 June 1895
- Monarch: Francis Joseph I
- Preceded by: Eduard von Taaffe
- Succeeded by: Erich von Kielmansegg

Personal details
- Born: 31 October 1851 Prague, Kingdom of Bohemia, Austrian Empire
- Died: 23 November 1927 (aged 76) Tachov, Bohemia, Czechoslovakia
- Spouse: Princess Gabrielle von Auersperg (m. 1877)
- Children: Princess Maria Hedwig of Windisch-Grätz; Prince Alfred Ludwig of Windisch-Grätz; Princess Christine of Windisch-Grätz; Prince Vincenz Alfred of Windisch-Grätz; Princess Agnes Mathilde of Windisch-Grätz; Princess Wilhelmine of Windisch-Grätz; Princess Maria Aglaë of Windisch-Grätz
- Parent(s): Alfred II, Prince of Windisch-Grätz; Princess Hedwig of Lobkowicz

Alfred III, Prince of Windisch-Grätz (German: Alfred August Karl Maria Wolfgang Erwin Fürst zu Windisch-Grätz; 31 October 1851, Prague – 23 November 1927, Tachov) was a Bohemian and Austrian nobleman, an Austro-Hungarian statesman who served as 11th Minister-President of Austria between 1893 and 1895, replacing the Count of Taaffe, who previously held this position for 14 straight years.

== Early life and ancestry ==
Born into an old House of Windisch-Grätz, one of the most prominent Austrian noble families, he was the only child of Alfred II, Prince of Windisch-Grätz (1819-1876), Lieutenant field marshal in the Imperial Austrian Army, and his wife, Princess Hedwig of Lobkowicz (1829-1852), the eldest daughter of Prince August Longin Josef of Lobkowicz (1797-1848), Governor of Lombardy, and his wife, Princess Bertha of Schwarzenberg (1807-1883).

== Biography ==
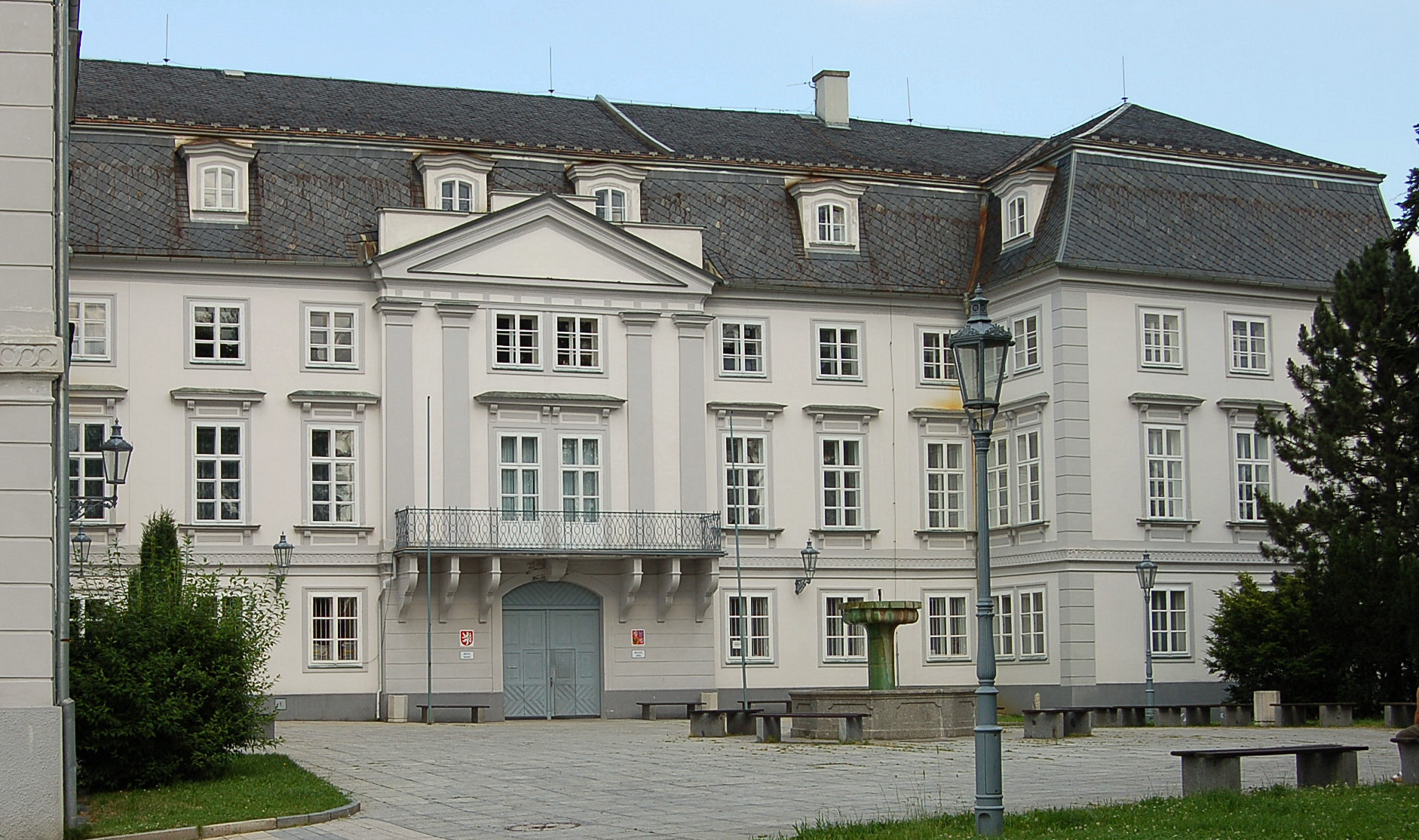
Tachov palace in Tachov.

His branch of the Windisch-Grätz family owned large estates in the Western Bohemia, German-populated area near the border with Germany. Alfred and his family resided in Tachov palace, Plzeň Region, which stayed in their possession until the beginning of WWII in 1939. His grandfather, Alfred I, Prince of Windisch-Grätz had begun to transform an old Tachov castle into a town palace, but his plans remained partly unfulfilled.

Alfred III, Prince of Windisch-Grätz served as the 11th Minister-President of Austria and was President of the Imperial Council from 1895 to 1918. He was also Hereditary Master of the Horse in the Duchy of Styria and Standesherr in the Kingdom of Württemberg.

== Personal life ==
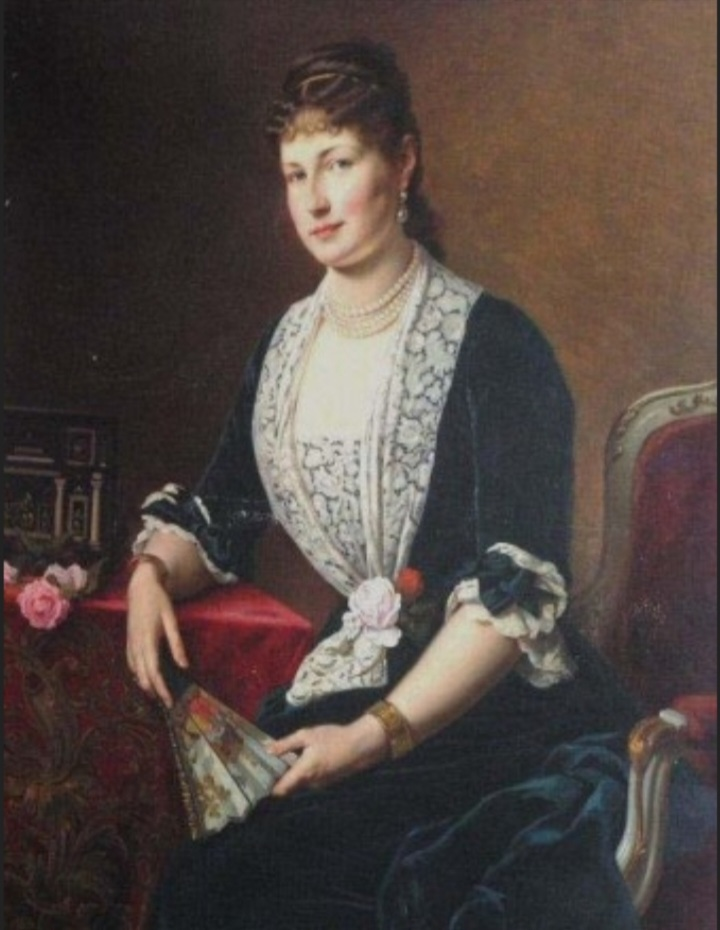
Alfred's wife, Princess Marie Gabrielle Eleonore von Auersperg (1855-1933).

He was married to Princess Marie Gabrielle Eleonore von Auersperg (1855-1933), the eldest daughter of Prince Vincenz Karl Joseph Gabriel Heinrich von Auersperg (1813-67) and his wife, Countess Wilhemine Josephine von Colloredo-Mannsfeld (1826-1898). Together, they had seven children, two sons and five daughters:

- Hereditary Prince Alfred Ludwig of Windisch-Grätz (1879-1880); died as a baby
- Hereditary Prince Vincenz Alfred Wilhelm Maria Gabriel of Windisch-Grätz (1882-1913); never married
- Princess Maria Hedwig Anna Bertha Wilhelmine Christiane Elisabeth Rositta of Windisch-Grätz (1878-1918); who married an Austrian ambassador to St. Petersburg, Count Frigyes Szapáry de Szapár, Muraszombat et Széchy-Sziget at the outbreak of World War I. They were maternal grandparents of Princess Michael of Kent (formerly Baroness Marie Christine von Reibnitz).
- Princess Christiane Maria Wilhelmine Eleonore Gabriele Juliana Aloysia of Windisch-Grätz (1881-1895); died as a teenager
- Princess Agnes Mathilde Maria Bertha Eleonore Valentine Juliana of Windisch-Grätz (1884-1969); married Count Adolf Maria von Thun und Hohenstein (1880-1957)
- Princess Wilhelmine of Windisch-Grätz (1885-1886); died as a baby
- Princess Maria-Aglaë Christiane Hedwig Gabriele Wilhelmine Hygina Ernestine of Windisch-Grätz (1887-1961); married Count Karl Apponyi de Nagy-Appony (1878-1959)

== Honours ==
- Knight of the Order of the Golden Fleece, 1884
- Grand Cross of the Order of St. Stephen, 1895

== Ancestry ==
Ancestors of Alfred III, Prince of Windisch-Grätz

16. Count Leopold Karl of Windisch-Grätz
8. Count Joseph Niclas of Windisch-Grätz
17. Countess Maria Antonia of Khevenhüller
4. Alfred I, Prince of Windisch-Grätz
18. Charles Marie Raymond, 5th Duke of Arenberg
9. Princess and Duchess Leopoldine of Arenberg
19. Countess Louise Marguerite de La Marck et de Schleiden
2. Alfred II, Prince of Windisch-Grätz
20. Johann Joseph, 5th Prince of Schwarzenberg(= 28.)
10. Joseph Johann, 6th Prince of Schwarzenberg (= 14.)
21. Countess Maria Eleonore of Oettingen-Wallerstein (= 29.)
5. Princess Eleonore of Schwarzenberg
22. Louis Engelbert, 6th Duke of Arenberg (= 30.)
11. Princesse and Duchess Pauline of Arenberg (= 15.)
23. Louise Antoinette de Brancas-Villars, Countess of Lauragais (= 31.)
1. Alfred III, Prince of Windisch-Grätz
24. Prince August Anton of Lobkowicz
12. Prince Anton Isidor of Lobkowicz
25. Countess Maria Ludmilla Czernin of Chudenitz
6. Prince August Longin of Lobkowicz
26. Joseph, 4th Prince Kinsky of Wchynitz and Tettau
13. Countess Maria Sidonia Kinsky of Wchinitz and Tettau
27. Countess Rosa Harrach-Rohrau of Thannhausen
3. Princess Hedwig of Lobkowicz
28. Johann Joseph, 5th Prince of Schwarzenberg (= 20.)
14. Joseph Johann, 6th Prince of Schwarzenberg (= 10.)
29. Countess Maria Eleonore of Oettingen-Wallerstein (= 21.)
7. Princessin Bertha of Schwarzenberg
30. Louis Engelbert, 6th Duke of Arenberg (= 22.)
15. Princesse and Duchess Pauline of Arenberg (= 11.)
31. Louise Antoinette de Brancas-Villars, Countess of Lauragais (= 23.)

== See also ==
- Windisch-Graetz
- First Grammar School, Celje
- Portrait
