= Prince Alfred =

Prince Alfred may refer to:

- Alfred, Duke of Saxe-Coburg and Gotha (1844–1900), second son and fourth child of Queen Victoria of the United Kingdom and Prince Albert
- Alfred, Hereditary Prince of Saxe-Coburg and Gotha (1874–1899), eldest child of Alfred, Duke of Saxe-Coburg and Gotha
- Alfred I, Prince of Windisch-Grätz (1787–1862), Austrian army officer
- Alfred II, Prince of Windisch-Grätz (1819–1876), son of the preceding
- Prince Alfred of Great Britain (1780–1783), fourteenth child of George III of the United Kingdom
- Prince Alfred of Liechtenstein (born 1842)
- Prince Alfred of Liechtenstein (born 1875), son of the preceding
- The Prince Alfred, Maida Vale, a pub in London, England
