= Hošperk Castle =

Former baroque palace of the Cobenzl and Windisch-Graetz family in Slovenia

Coordinates: 45.8280°N 14.2649°E

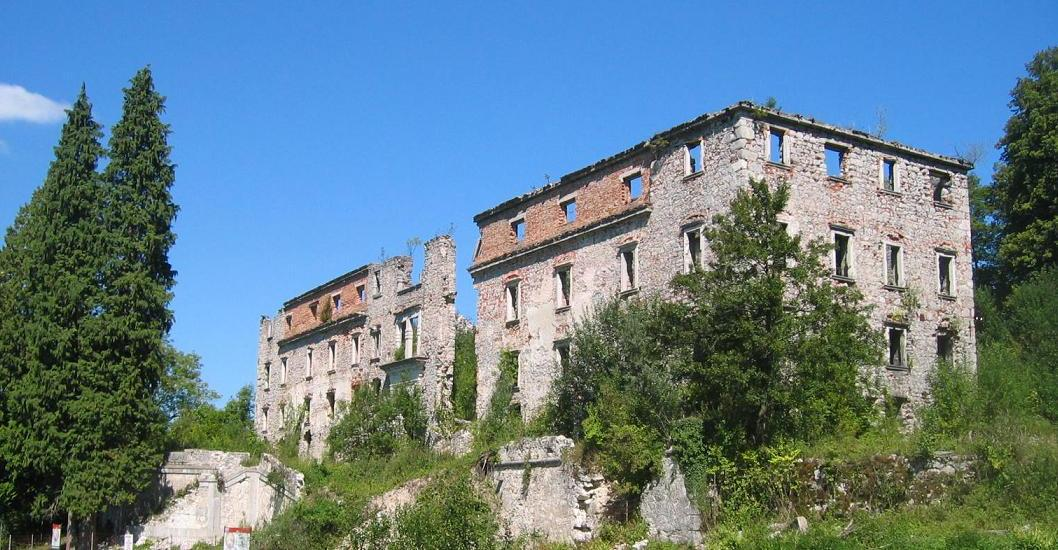
Hošperk Castle or Haasberg Manor (2006)

Hošperk Castle, also known as Haasberg Castle or Haasber Manor (Slovene: dvorec Hošperk or German: Schloss Haasberg), is a ruined baroque style mansion located near the village of Planina, in the Municipality of Postojna, southwestern Slovenia. Originally established as a medieval fortress, the manor underwent several transformations over centuries and played a notable role in the regional history of Carniola. Once a seat of aristocratic families such as the Eggenbergs, Cobenzls, and Windisch-Grätz, it was largely destroyed during the Second World War. The site is now recognized as a cultural monument and subject to conservation efforts.

== Location ==
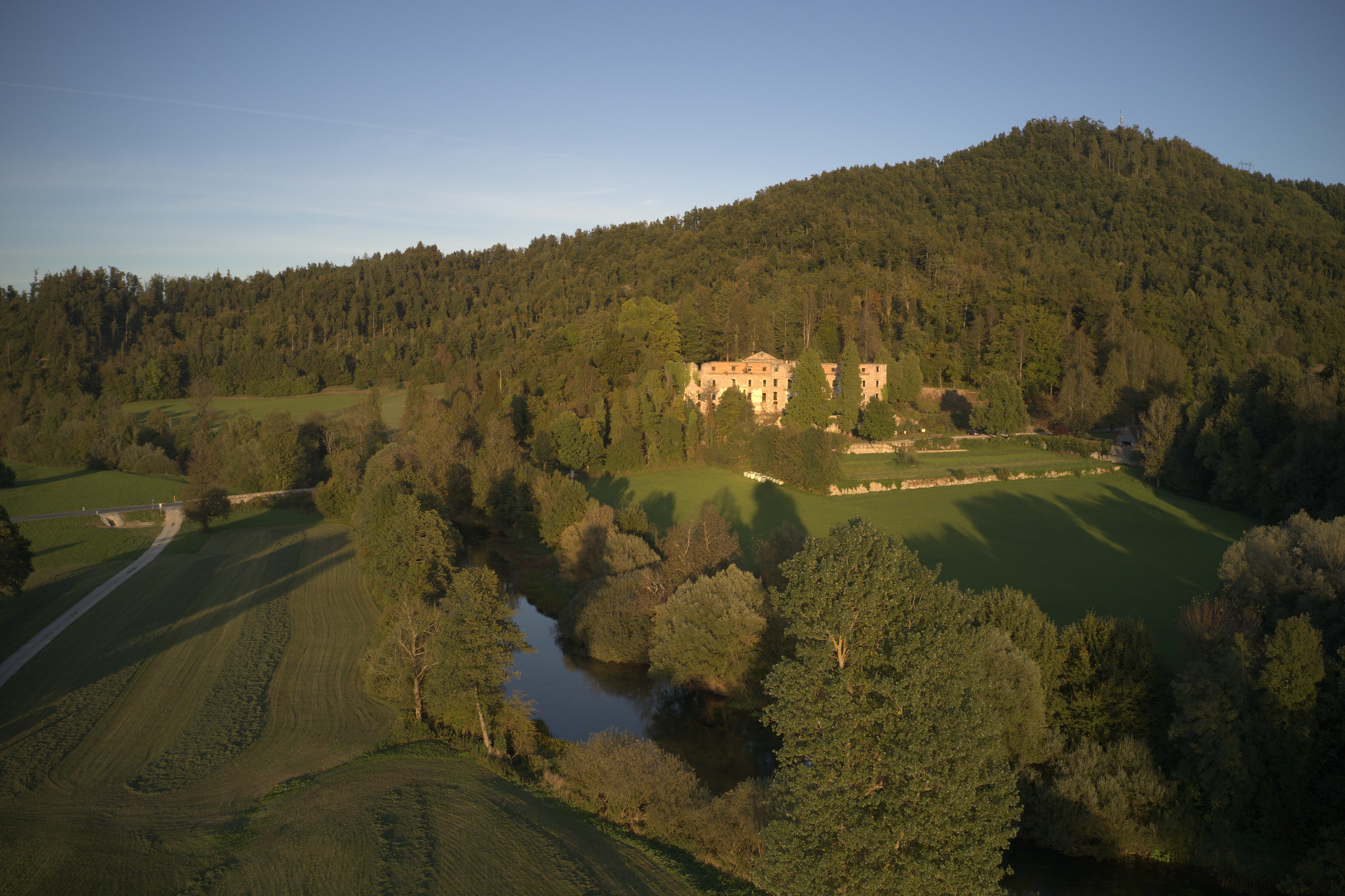
Haasberg seen from a distance (2019)

The manor stands at the south western edge of the Planina Karst field, near the entrance to Planina Cave and the intermittent Unica River, a unique hydrological feature of the region. Its position atop a gentle elevation gave it both strategic advantage and scenic prominence. Historically, it stood along key routes connecting Carniola to Trieste, which made it important both militarily and economically.

== History ==
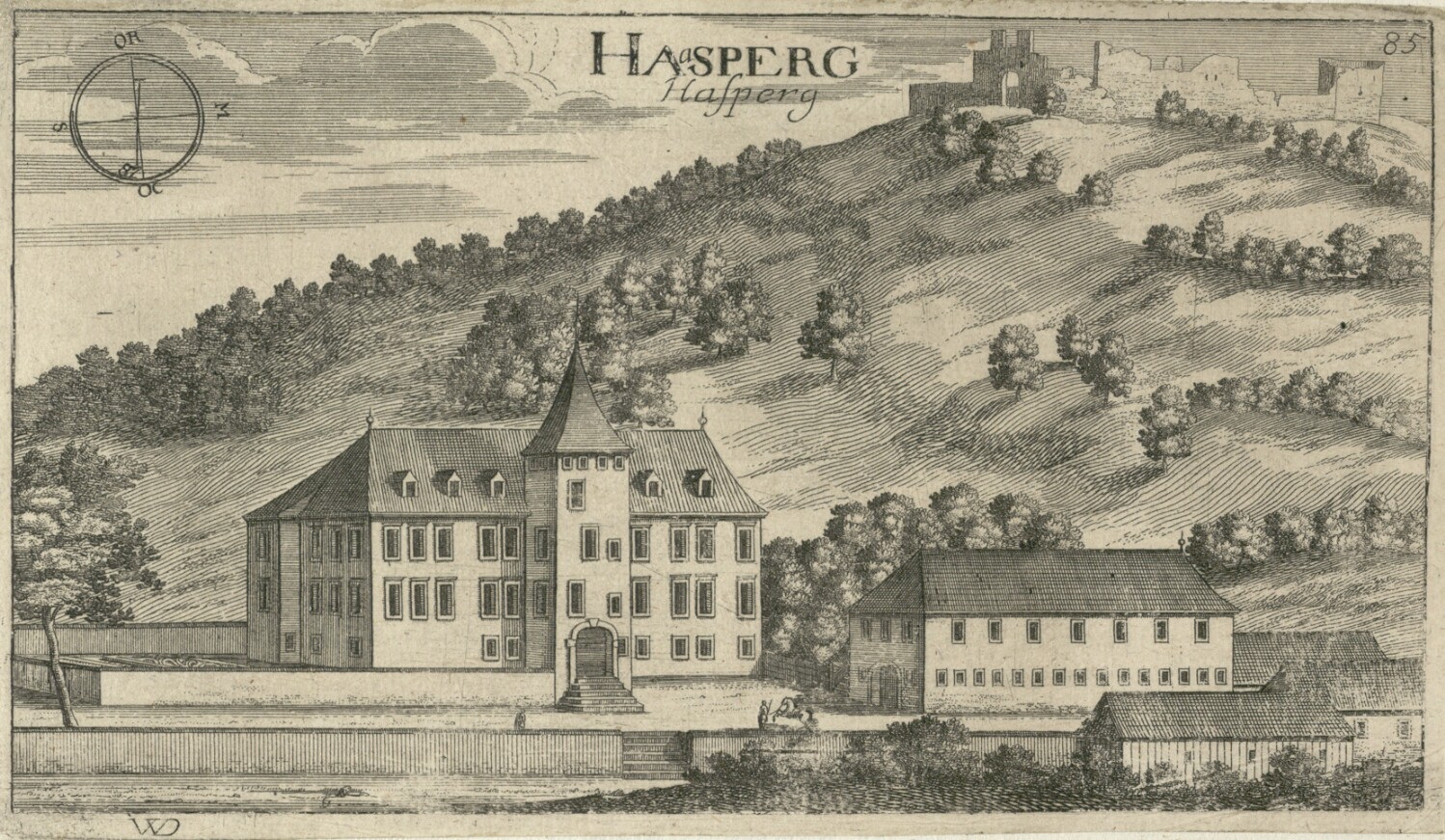
Haasberg around 1679

=== Medieval origins ===
The earliest fortification on the site was known as castrum Moevntz or Unec Castle, which likely originated in the 11th century. Situated strategically along key trade and pilgrimage routes across the Karst plateau and Inner Carniola, the castle belonged to the Counts of Gorizia. It served a defensive and administrative function through the High Middle Ages.

In 1511, a powerful earthquake devastated much of western Slovenia and severely damaged the original structure. The ruins were eventually abandoned, and the feudal seat was relocated to lower ground near the Unica River floodplain.

=== 17th century: Eggenberg residence ===
In the aftermath of the castle's decline, the Eggenberg family, a princely house with extensive holdings in Inner Austria and the Habsburg lands, initiated the construction of a Renaissance-style manor house at the base of the old castle hill around 1614.

This early version of the manor was relatively modest—a two-story rectangular building accompanied by stables and utilitarian outbuildings. It served as an estate seat for the surrounding agricultural lands and was already equipped with elements of formality, including a small garden and a chapel.

=== 18th century: Baroque transformation and the Cobenzl family ===
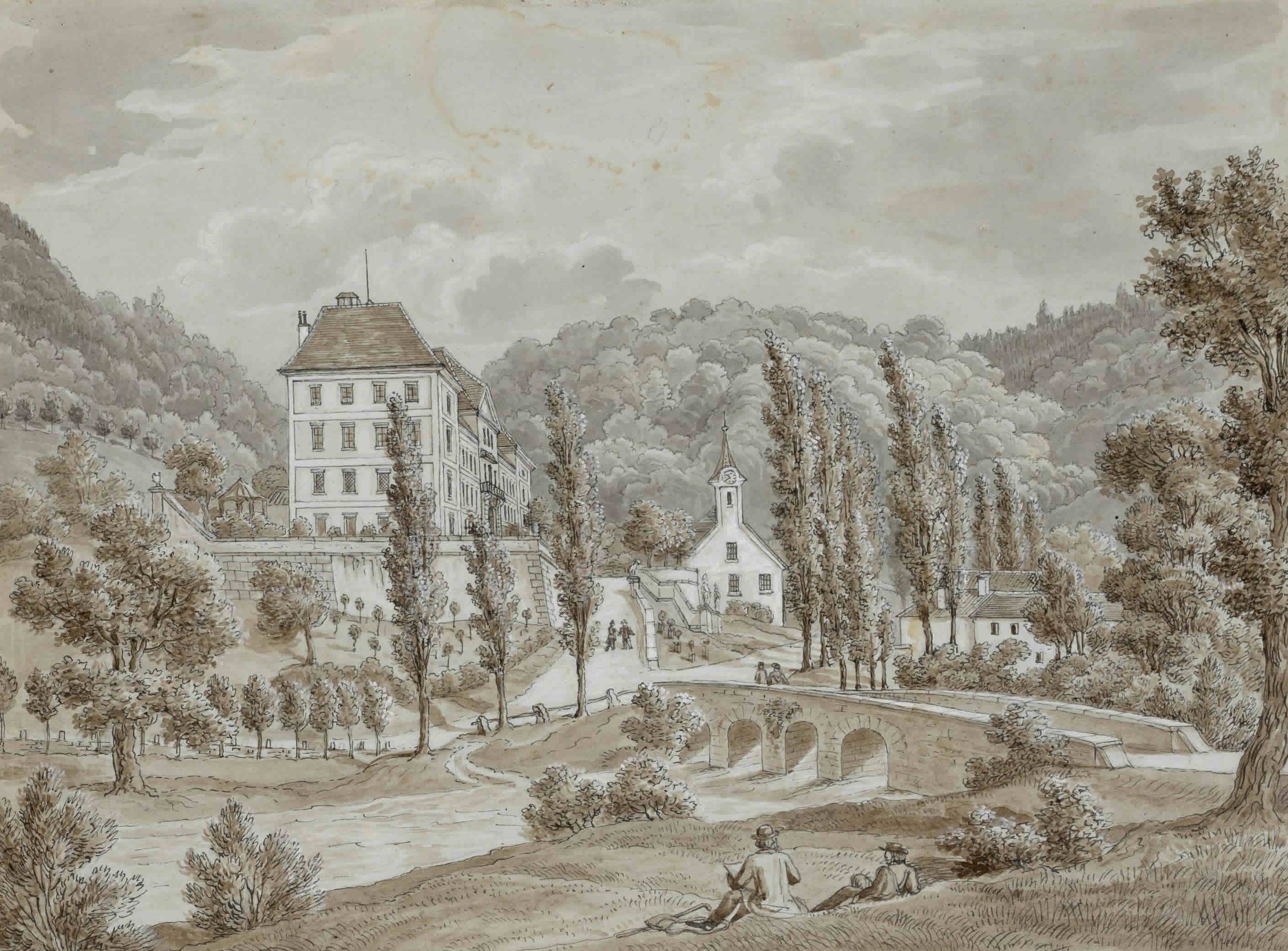
Haasberg by Franz Kurz zum Thurn und Goldenstein around 1850

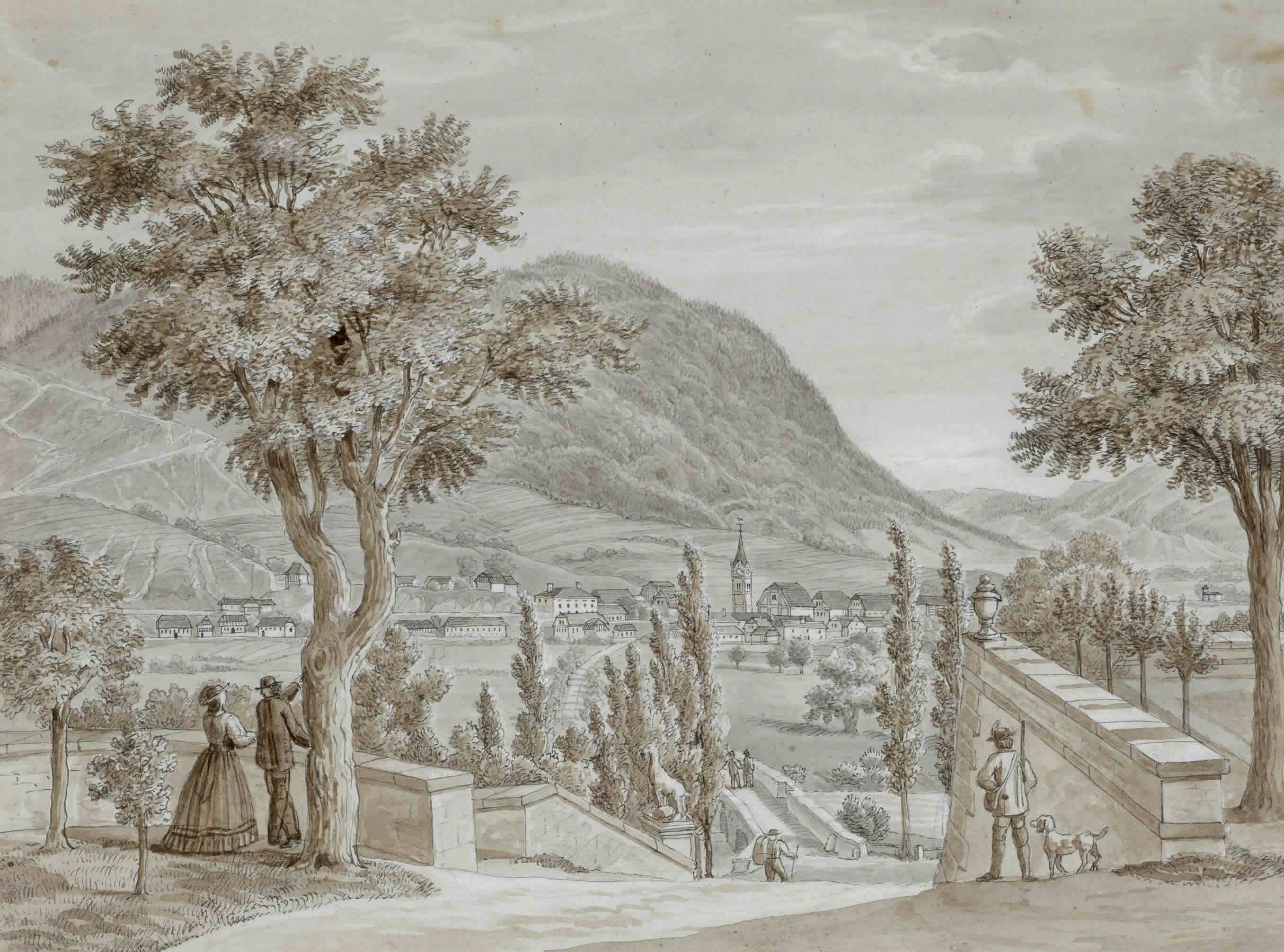
View from Haasberg to Planina

The major transformation of Haasberg Manor began after 1716, when Princess Maria Charlotte of Eggenberg sold the estate—along with the lordships of Štemberk and Logatec—to Count Johann Caspar von Cobenzl (1664–1742). The Cobenzl family was a distinguished Austrian noble family originally from Carinthia, with substantial holdings in what is today western Slovenia and parts of the historical County of Gorizia and Gradisca, now in northeastern Italy. Johann Caspar was a loyal servant of emperor Charles VI and laid the basis for the flowering of the Cobenzl family in the eighteenth century, when three generations of Cobenzls occupied positions of influence at the imperial Court and in public affairs.

Count Johann Caspar commissioned Carlo Martinuzzi, a Venetian-trained architect active throughout Central Europe, to convert the existing residence into a grand Baroque palace. Under Martinuzzi’s direction, Haasberg was rebuilt as an elegant four-story structure, distinguished by a monumental central portal, high mansard roofs, and a balustraded balcony above the entrance.

The estate was further enhanced with elaborately designed formal gardens, which included fountains, parterre flowerbeds, and ornamental trees laid out in geometric symmetry. Inside, the manor featured frescoed ceilings, intricate stucco decoration, parquet flooring, and imported furnishings. A private family chapel and crypt were also added, reflecting the Cobenzl family's intent to make Haasberg their principal residence and dynastic seat.

Upon Count Johann Caspar’s death in 1742, the estate passed to his son, Johann Karl Philipp von Cobenzl (1712-1770), a prominent diplomat and passionate art collector. He served as minister plenipotentiary of the Austrian Netherlands in Brussels under Empress Maria Theresia from 1753 until his death in 1770. During this time, Haasberg became a repository for his extensive art collection, which included works acquired across Europe. An inventory of Haasberg compiled in 1770 lists 119 paintings. These were mostly in groups of works in black or gilded frames, but several portraits are described, two paintings by Rubens (in black frames), various saints, the Three Kings and a Susanna, several Blümenstücke and landscapes. However, his lavish spending on artworks and estate embellishments left his widow with significant debts upon his death. These debts were subsequently paid by Empress Maria Theresa, who also provided financial support to the widow, recognizing the Cobenzl family's service to the Habsburg crown.

When count Johann Philipp died in 1810, the Cobenzl family became extinct. The family estates were inherited by a distant relative, count Michael Coronini von Cronberg, including Haasberg manor and the adjoining Predjama Castle.

=== 19th century: Windisch-Grätz ownership ===
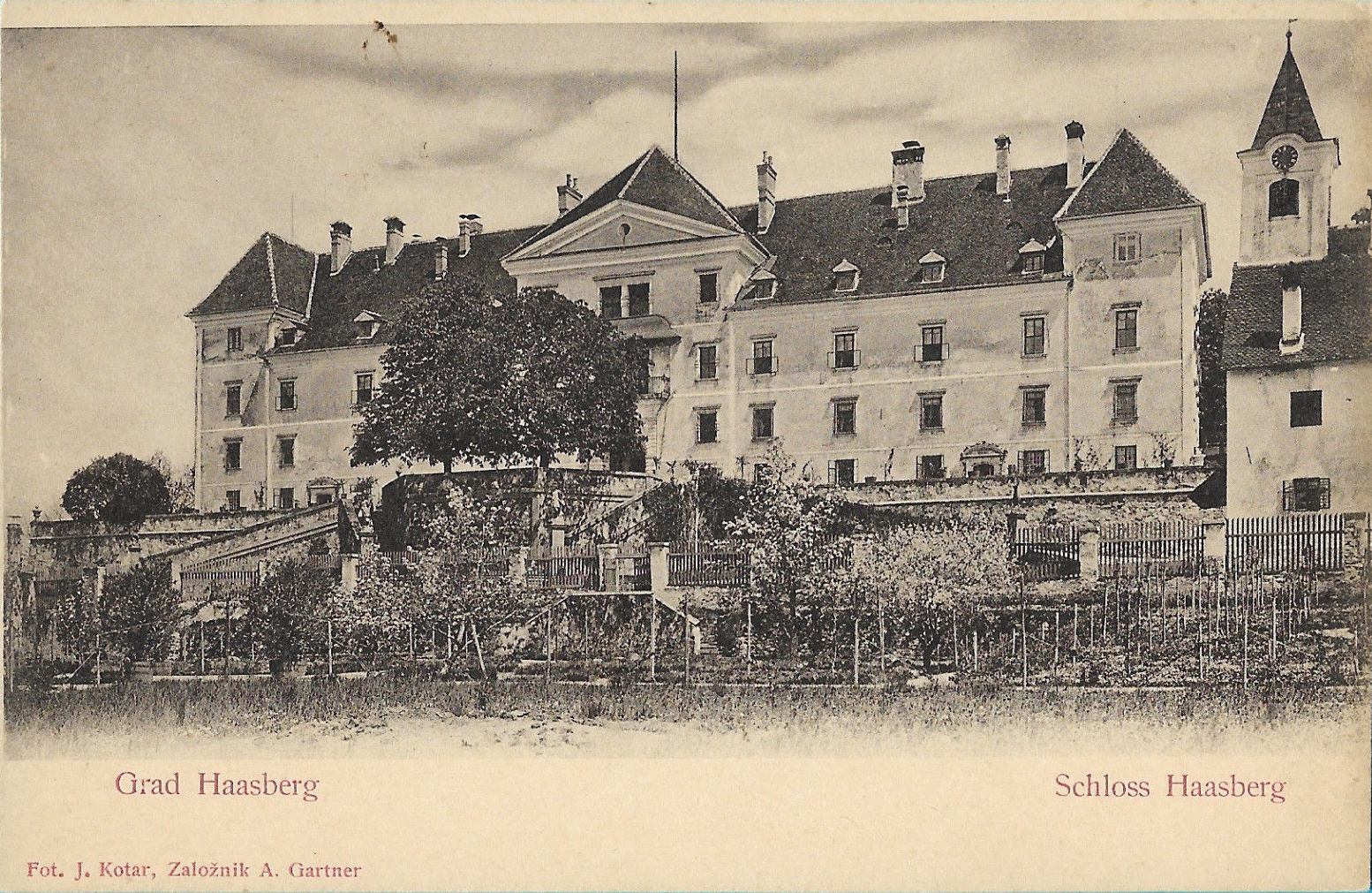
Haasberg in 1908

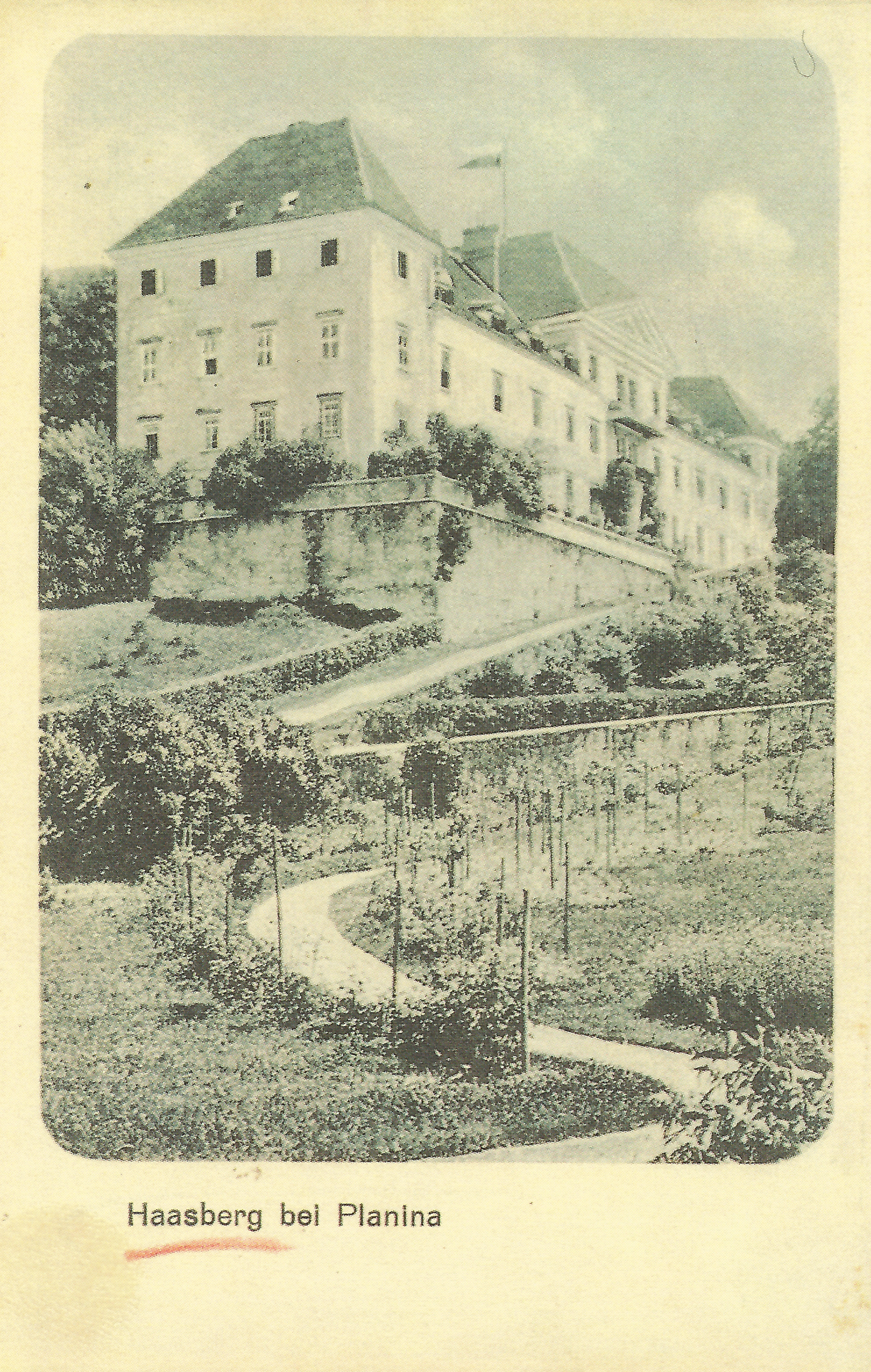
Haasberg in 1905

A new chapter in the history of Haasberg Manor began in the mid-19th century. Following the death of Count Michael Coronini von Cronberg in 1824, his widow, Sofia Fagan-Coronini, inherited the estate. In 1846, she sold Haasberg Manor, along with Predjama Castle, Šteberk, and Logatec, to Weriand of Windisch-Graetz (1790-1867).

The House of Windisch-Graetz was an old Slovene-Austrian noble family with origins in Lower Styria (present-day Slovenj Gradec. In 1822, Weriand and his elder brother, Alfred I, Prince of Windisch-Grätz, were both elevated to princely rank within the Austrian Empire. While Alfred inherited the family's principal seat at Tachov in Bohemia, Weriand sought to establish a residence for the cadet branch of the family he founded.

With the support of a substantial dowry provided by his mother, Maria Leopoldine of Arenberg, a member of the influential House of Arenberg, Prince Weriand acquired various estates in Slovenia. Among these, Haasberg Manor served as the main seat of his line and was developed into a residence befitting princely status.

The manor was further expanded and redecorated in accordance with Historicist tastes of the 19th century, blending Baroque foundations with Romantic revivalist interiors. The estate hosted frequent visitors, including members of the imperial family, such as emperor Franz Joseph I and emperor Charles I.

Prince Weriand of Windisch-Graetz was succeeded by his son, Prince Hugo (1823–1904), who was married to Princess Luise Marie Helene of Mecklenburg-Schwerin (1824–1859), daughter of Paul Frederick, Grand Duke of Mecklenburg-Schwerin.

The third prince residing at Haasberg was their son, Hugo (1854–1920), who inherited the estate and continued to use it as the main seat of the Slovenian branch of the family into the early 20th century.

Following the First World War, the Treaty of Rapallo established the border between the Kingdom of Italy and the newly formed Kingdom of Serbs, Croats and Slovenes, later Yugoslavia. This new boundary split the settlement of Planina; part of the village, including Haasberg Manor, fell on the Italian side of the border.

A description of Haasberg by a former employee who had worked there prior to the Second World War recalls the manor's artistic and cultural richness:

"There was a vast library, a statue of Johann Caspar Cobenzl, various Cobenzl portraits, and scenes from the Old Testament—i.e., the Judgment of Solomon, Samson, Abraham’s Sacrifice—and other works by great masters such as Dürer, Titian, and others. Above, in front of the balcony room, was a depiction of the Romans’ Entry into Jerusalem. This painting was more than four metres long. In the balcony hall were family pictures, portraits of kings, princes, and a particularly valuable painting by Dürer: a daughter breastfeeding her own father in prison."

The manor's library was reputed to house rare manuscripts, imperial correspondence, and Enlightenment-era scientific works. The grounds were meticulously maintained and supported by a network of roads, barns, mills, and peasant cottages, forming the basis of the estate’s rural economy.

=== Destruction in the Second World War ===
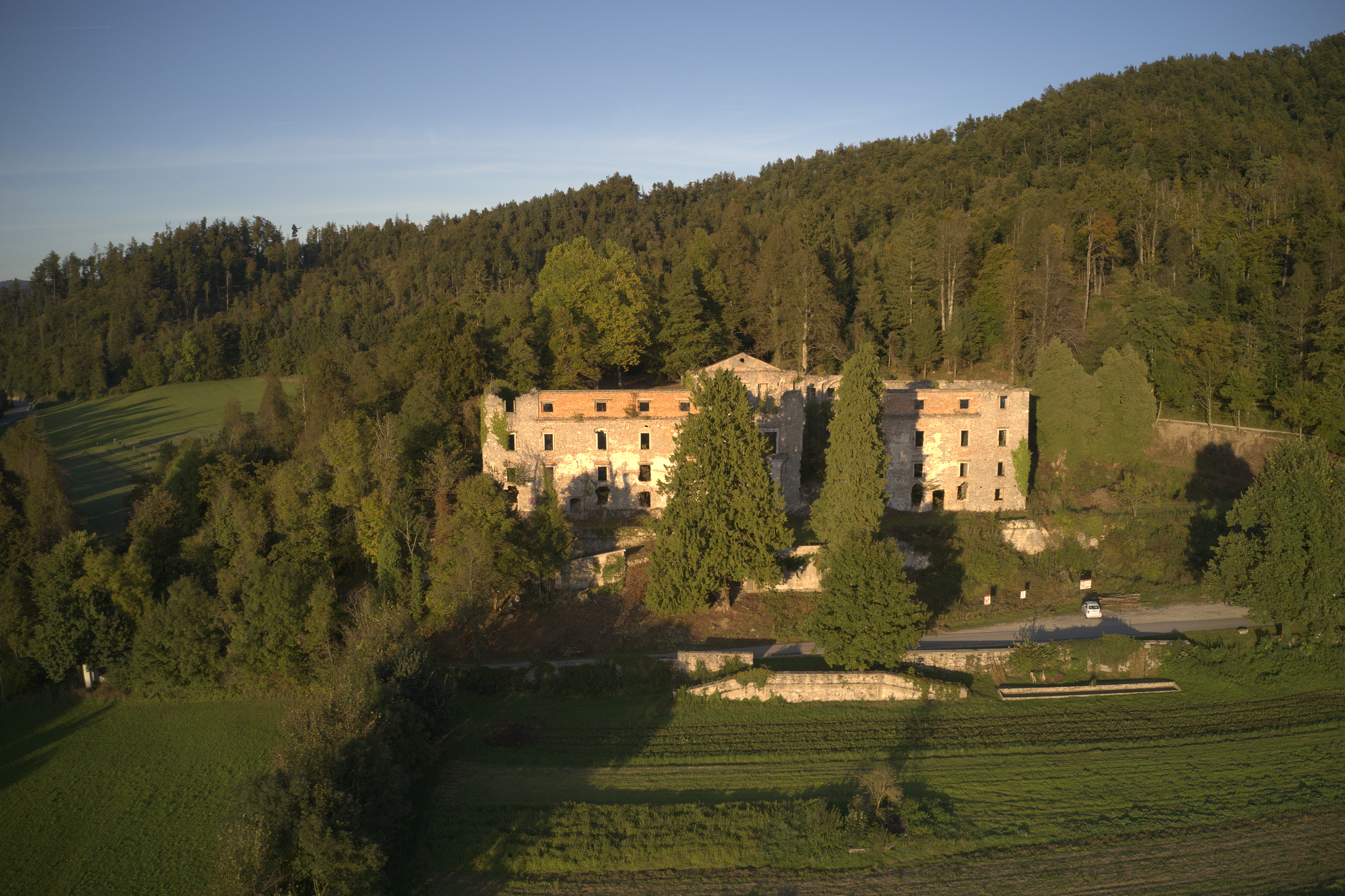
Haasberg in ruins (2019)

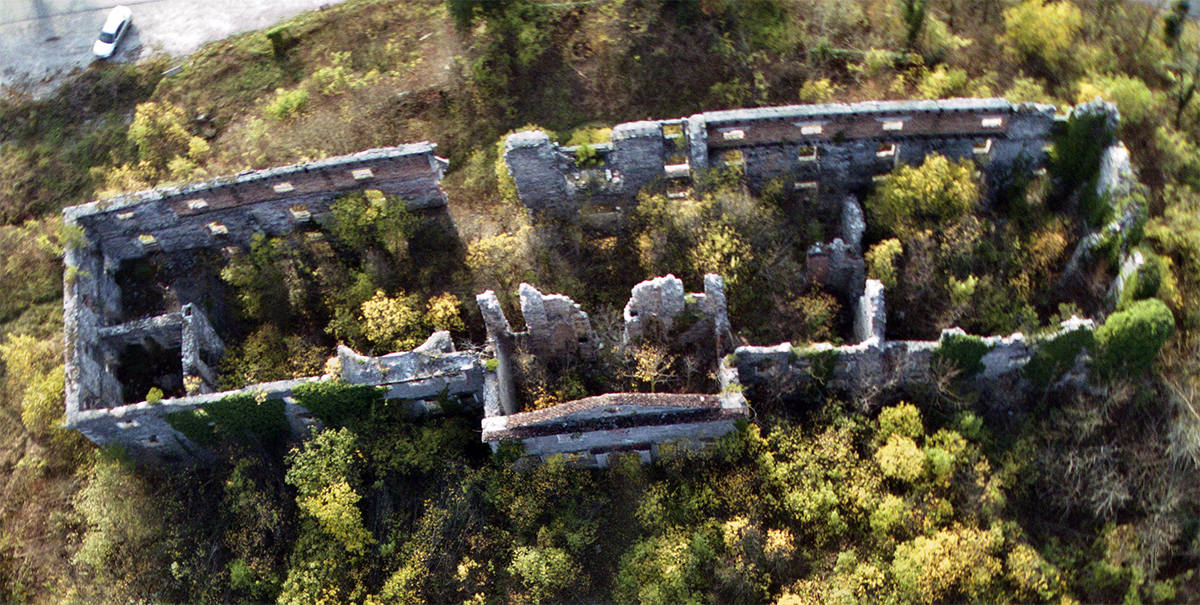
Haasberg in ruins (2017)

During the Second World War, Haasberg Manor was deliberately targeted by communist Yugoslav Partisan forces. On 27 March 1944, they set the building on fire to prevent its possible use by German military units, although German forces were reportedly no longer present at the estate. The resulting blaze destroyed the roof and upper floors, and much of the manor’s valuable interior—furnishings, artworks, archives, and the family library—was either consumed by fire or looted in the aftermath.

Following the end of the war, the manor was left in a ruined and abandoned state. Under the new communist Yugoslav government, aristocratic properties such as Haasberg were nationalized, and no restoration efforts were undertaken. Over time, the structure deteriorated further due to weathering, neglect, and the loss of protective architectural elements.

The last Windish-Graetz prince living at Haasberg was prince Hugo (1887-1959). After 1945, he lived in Italy and died in Trieste in Friuli-Venezia Giulia.

=== Postwar period and ruin ===
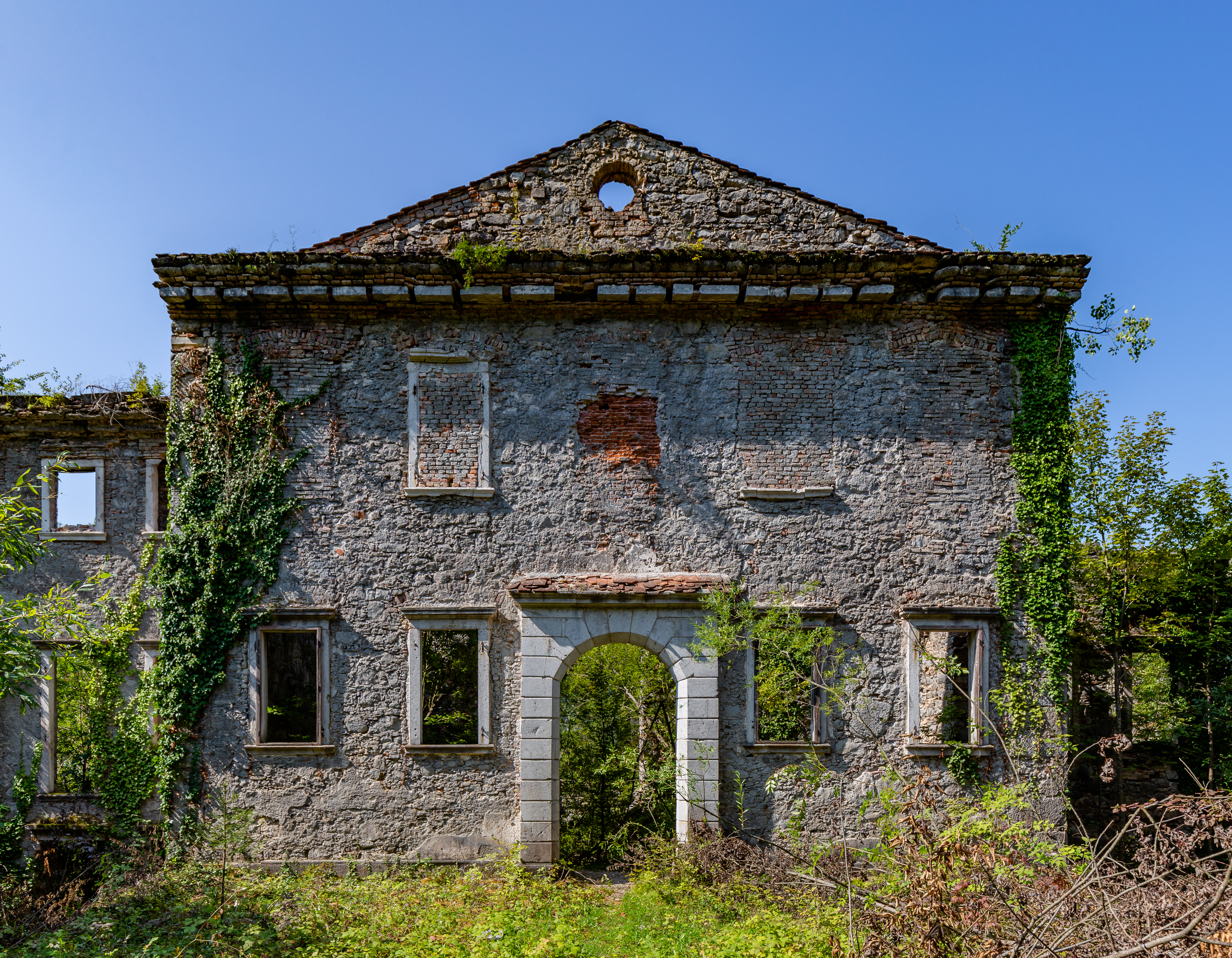
Haasberg ruins (2018)

By the 1950s, Haasberg Manor stood as an open ruin, exposed to the elements. Its monumental façade partially survived, along with fragments of the central stairwell and the northern and western wings. Some of the stone sculptures, such as a heraldic lion and decorative portals, were moved to museums or reused elsewhere.

In 1984, the ruins were officially designated as a protected cultural monument by the Slovenian authorities. However, for decades the site saw no conservation work and became overgrown, subject to vandalism and collapse.

A 2020 earthquake caused further structural damage to the surviving walls and led to renewed calls for preservation.

=== Preservation and digital reconstruction ===
In recent years, local organizations and architectural firms have begun work to document and stabilize what remains of Haasberg Manor. The Void Arhitektura studio has proposed a conservation plan that includes:

- Wall stabilization and structural shoring;
- Temporary roof coverage for fragile segments;
- A viewing ramp for visitors; and
- Interpretive signage and on-site exhibitions.

Simultaneously, a digital reconstruction by the nonprofit Projekt Feniks offers a virtual walk-through of the palace as it appeared in the early 18th century. This has become a valuable tool for public education and heritage tourism.

=== Current use and accessibility ===
Today, the ruins of Haasberg Manor are accessible to visitors, though entry inside the remaining structure is prohibited for safety reasons. A small exhibition area known as the “Castle Barn” has been developed nearby, showcasing archival photographs, models, and local history artifacts, as well as live animals such as donkeys and goats.

Waymarked hiking trails connect the site with the Planina Cave and the surrounding karst landscape, providing opportunities for cultural and natural exploration.

== Windisch-Graetz family chapel ==
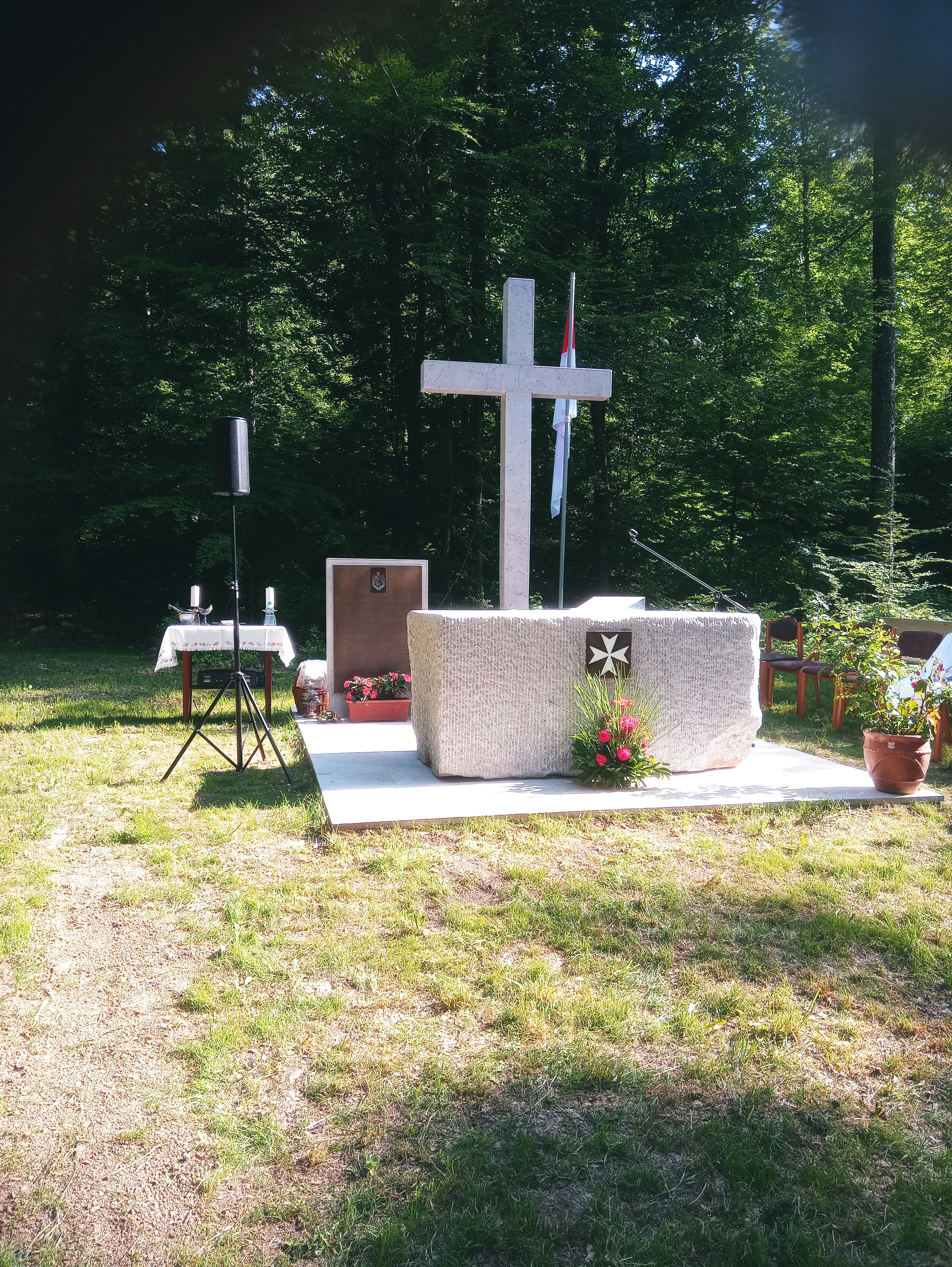
Windisch-Graetz Memorial (2025)

=== Chapel with the Windisch-Graetz family crypt ===
The monumental chapel housing the Windisch-Graetz family crypt, built in 1898 not far from the burned Haasberg Manor, fell into disrepair following the end of World War II. In 1966, the chapel was desecrated and demolished. The official justification for this act stated that, as architecture built in the Neo-Romanesque style, it possessed no monument-worthy value.

The building had been a large and representative structure, designed in the style of a three-nave church with an arcaded entrance porch, a taller central nave, and lower symmetrical side chapels terminating in flat ends.

=== Memorial marker at the site of the former chapel ===
It was not until 2025 that prince Mariano Hugo (Ambassador of the Sovereign Military Order of Malta to Slovenia) and his wife succeeded in obtaining all necessary consents and permits to install a memorial marker at the site of the former chapel and family crypt. The memorial includes a cross, an altar table, and a plaque bearing the names of the Windisch-Graetz family members buried there.

== Literature ==
- Stopar, Ivan (1987). Gradovi na Slovenskem (in Slovenian). Ljubljana.
- Žigon, Tanja (1992). Grad Haasberg in knezi Windischgraetzi (in Slovenian).
- Kos, Dušan (2005). Vitez in Grad. Vloga gradov v življenju plemstva na Kranjskem, slovenskem Štajerskem in slovenskem Koroškem do začetka 15. stoletja (in Slovenian). Ljubljana. pp. 136–137.
- Miladinović Zalaznik, Mira (2021). Europa östlich des Westens : 30 Jahre Transition. Quo vadis?: Auf der Suche nach Gottlieb Fürst Windisch-Graetz (in German). Inštitut Nove revije, zavod za humanistiko. ISBN 978-961-7014-31-0.
