= Ošelín =

- Municipality
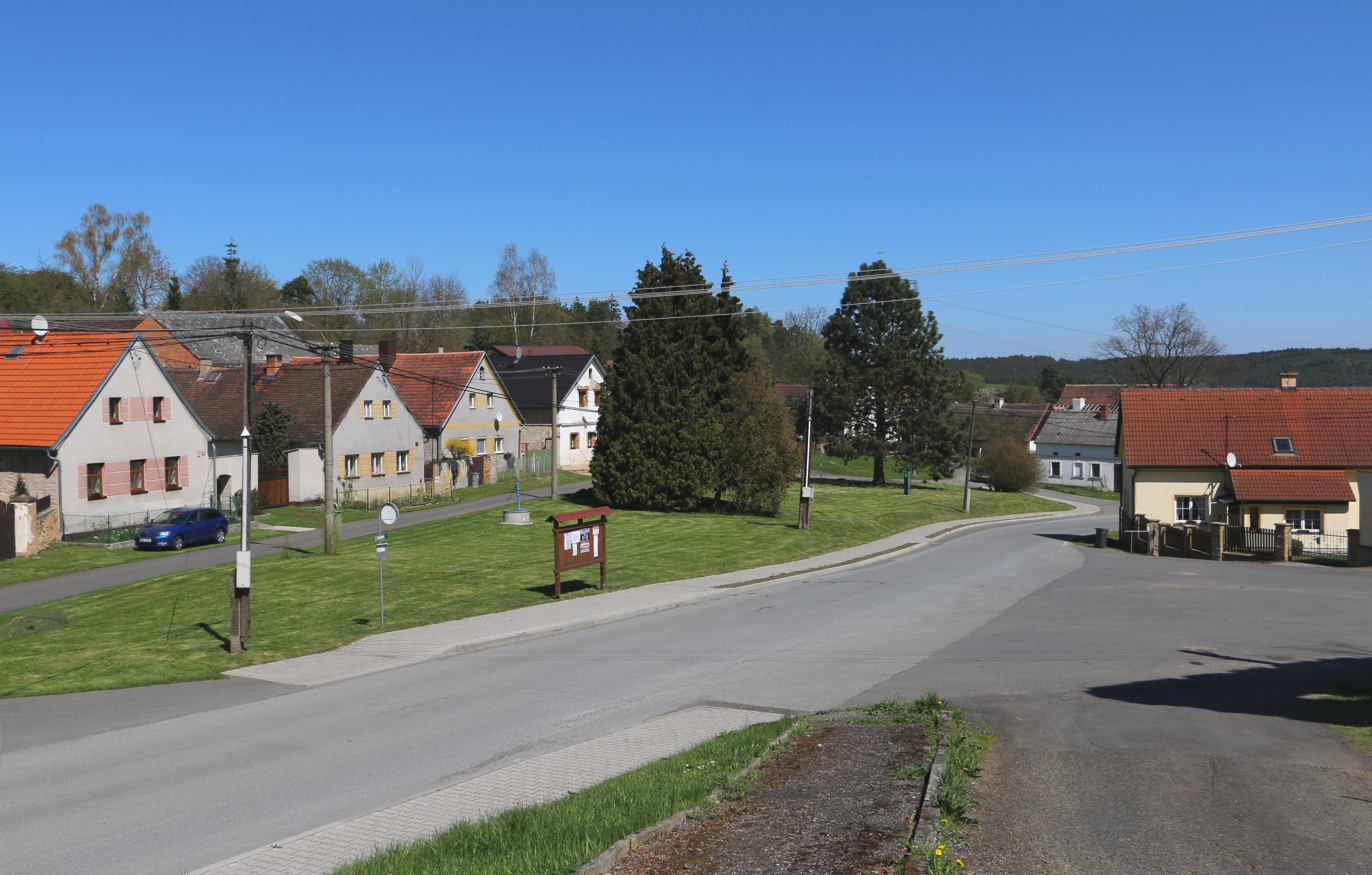
- Centre of Ošelín

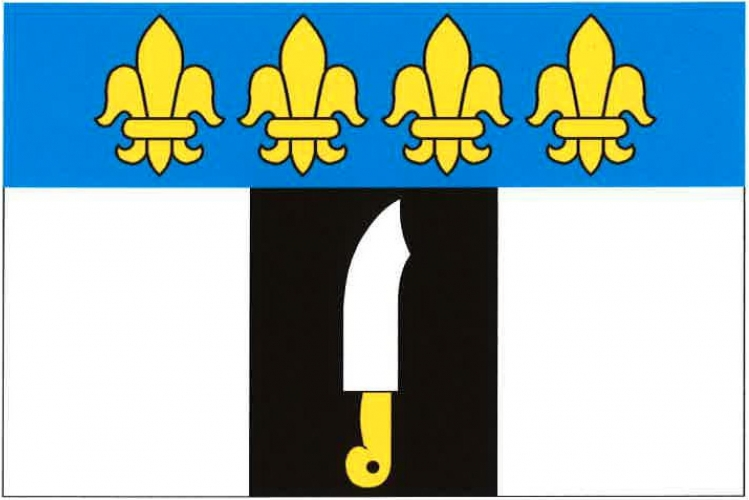
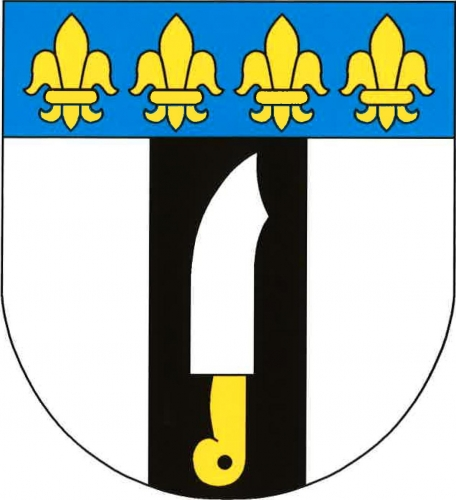
- Flag Coat of arms

- Location in the Czech Republic
- Coordinates: 49°46′20″N 12°51′22″E
- Country: Czech Republic
- Region: Plzeň
- District: Tachov
- First mentioned: 1379

Area
  - Total: 14.40 km^{2} (5.56 sq mi)
- Elevation: 478 m (1,568 ft)

Population (2026-01-01)
  - Total: 162
  - Density: 11.3/km^{2} (29.1/sq mi)
- Time zone: UTC+1 (CET)
  - Summer (DST): UTC+2 (CEST)
- Postal codes: 348 02, 349 01
- Website: www.oselin.cz

Ošelín (German: Oschelin) is a municipality and village in Tachov District in the Plzeň Region of the Czech Republic. It has about 200 inhabitants.

Ošelín lies approximately 18 kilometres (11 mi) east of Tachov, 38 km (24 mi) west of Plzeň, and 118 km (73 mi) west of Prague.

== Administrative division ==
Ošelín consists of five municipal parts (in brackets population according to the 2021 census):

- Ošelín (112)
- Dolní Plezom (0)
- Horní Plezom (10)
- Lobzy (17)
- Plezom (6)

== Demographics ==
Historical population
Year	Pop.	±%
1869	786	—
1880	720	−8.4%
1890	746	+3.6%
1900	689	−7.6%
1910	712	+3.3%
1921	722	+1.4%
1930	735	+1.8%
1950	314	−57.3%
1961	280	−10.8%
1970	210	−25.0%
1980	184	−12.4%
1991	148	−19.6%
2001	135	−8.8%
2011	112	−17.0%
2021	145	+29.5%
Source: Censuses

== Notable people ==
- Marie Ševčíková (1947–2010), Czech-Danish footballer
