= Marie Ševčíková =

Czech-Danish footballer (1947–2010)

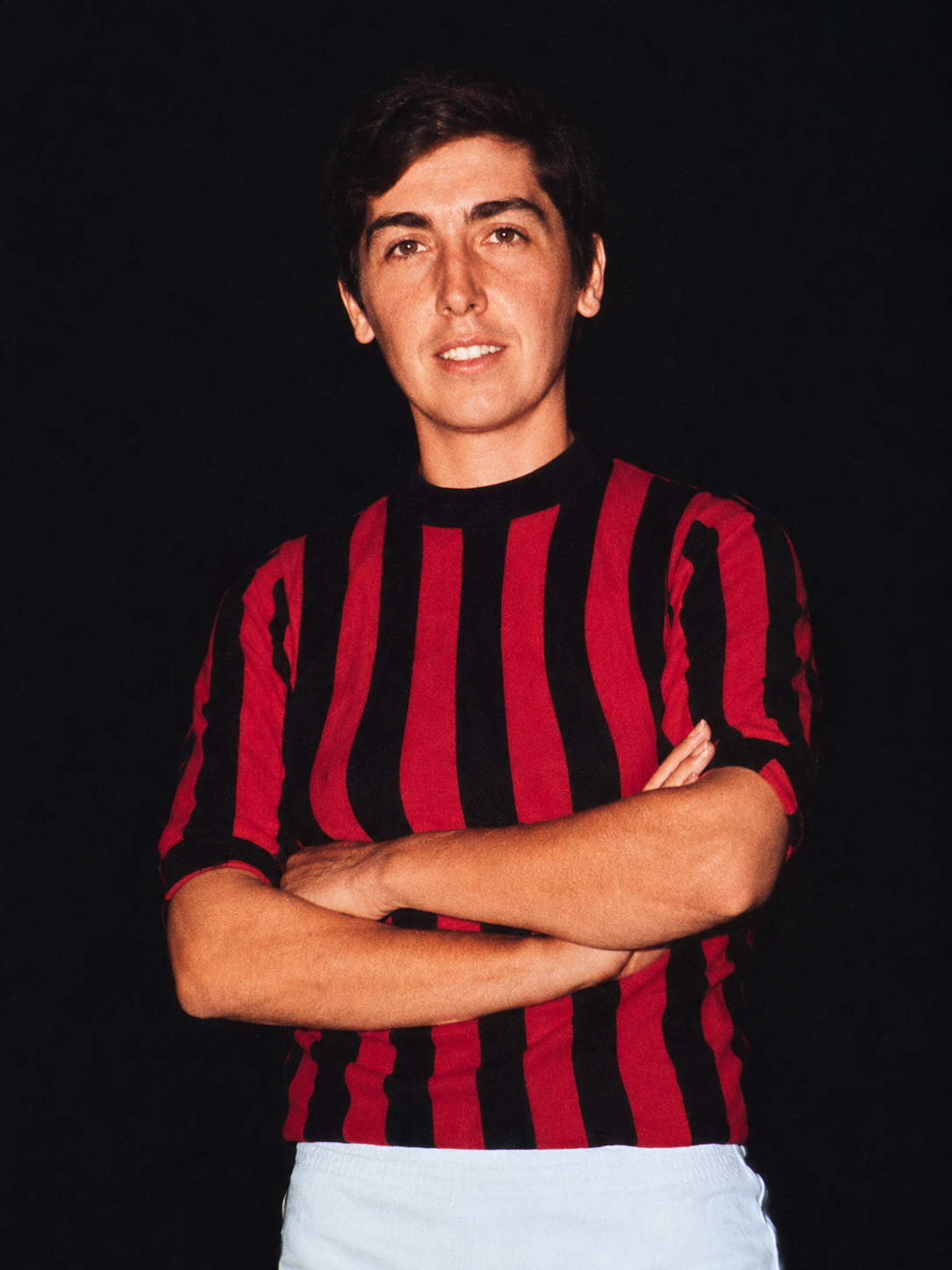
- Marie Ševčíková at the 1970 World Cup

Personal information
- Full name: Marie Anna Ševčíková
- Date of birth: 20 November 1947
- Place of birth: Lobzy, Czechoslovakia
- Date of death: 28 June 2010 (aged 62)
- Place of death: Glostrup, Denmark
- Height: 1.80 m (5 ft 11 in)
- Position: Left wing

Senior career*
Years	Team	Apps	(Gls)
1966–1968	Slavia Prague		
1968–1970	BK Femina		
1971–1972	Fiorentina Elettroplaid		
1973	GS Casabella Perignano		
1974–1975	BK Femina		

International career
1969–1971	Denmark		
Medal record
Representing Denmark
Women's World Cup
Winner	1970 Denmark
Euro Women's Championship
Runner-up	1969 Denmark
Coppa Italia
Runner-up	1971 ACF Fiorentina Elettroplaid
Danish Women's League
Winner	1975 Femina BK
O srdce Mladého světa
Winner	1966 SK Slavia Prague
Winner	1967 SK Slavia Prague
Torneo Internazionale di Riccione
Winner	1967 SK Slavia Prague
- * Club domestic league appearances and goals

Marie Ševčíková (20 November 1947 – 28 June 2010) was a Czech-Danish footballer who played in attack on the left wing. She won silver medals at the Euro 1969 with Denmark and won the 1970 World Cup with the Danish team. In August 1969, Ševčíková was the first ever female footballer from Czechoslovakia to be offered a place in the Italian league.

== Personal life ==
Ševčíková was born in the agricultural settlement of Lobzy, where her parents came shortly after the war after the expulsion of the original German population. After a few years, the whole family moved to Rokycany. After the Warsaw Pact invasion of Czechoslovakia in August 1968, Ševčíková left for Denmark, where after some time she also acquired citizenship. Although she played football professionally, she had to go to work at the same time. In Prague she worked for Motorlet, in Copenhagen first for A.M. Hirschsprung & Sønner for the manufacture of cigars, and then at the local branch of the British photographic manufacturer Ilford Photo. With the exception of a stint in Italy (1971–1973), Marie Ševčíková lived in Denmark until her death in 2010. She returned to her native country only for short visits of a few days. Her brother Petr also left Czechoslovakia in the autumn of 1968. First to the Federal Republic of Germany and then to Canada and the United States. However, unlike his sister, he returned in January 1972. Immediately after his arrival he was arrested and sentenced by the then communist regime to 18 months for leaving the republic. Petr Ševčík was persecuted by the regime even after his release. He died in 2013.

== Club career ==
She started playing football in the autumn of 1966 in Slavia Prague, and at the end of October of the same year she won the 1st edition of the "O srdce Mladého světa" tournament. Slavia repeated their triumph at the tournament a year later. The Slavia team went from victory to victory not only at home but also abroad. In July 1967, they won the Torneo di Riccione tournament in Italy in which they successively defeated the teams A.C.F. Fiorentina Elettroplaid, Bologna C.F. and A.C.F. Ambrosiana SNIA. In June and July 1968, Slavia also defeated the Danish team Femina BK twice (2–0, 3–2).

After the invasion of Warsaw Pact troops in August 1968, Ševčíková and another Slavia teammate Jana Mandíková decided to leave Czechoslovakia and applied for political asylum in Denmark. Both started playing for Femina BK, a club they knew well from recent friendlies. In July 1969, the Danish club played several friendlies in Italy, during which Ševčíková dazzled with her performances to such an extent that leading Italian club Real Torino offered her a professional contract. However, Ševčíková's contract was eventually terminated when she and the club failed to agree on a remuneration.

Ševčíková went back to Denmark, where she played for Femina BK again. However, she did not disappear from the radar of Italian clubs, so in May 1971 she again went to Italy, where she started playing for the first league club ACF Elettroplaid Fiorentina. In his colours that same year, she reaches the final of the Italian Cup, in which she falls short to Roma CF (0–1). Ševčíková plays for Fiorentina until 1972. She leaves for a year to play and coach at the nearby club GS Casabella Perignano, which operates in the second highest Italian competition. In 1974, Ševčíková returns again to Femina BK, where she also works as a coach for the first year. In 1975, she won the championship title with the team.

== International career ==
At the turn of the 1960s and 1970s, Femina BK, for which Ševčíková and Mandíková played, represented Denmark at the first European and World Championships. At the Euro, held in Italy in 1969, Denmark made it to the finals, where they won silver medals after losing to home country Italy. With the same team, Ševčíková and Mandíková won the World Cup in Italy in July 1970. In the final, Denmark defeated Italy 2-0 when Ševčíková scored the decisive goal with a beautiful shot from distance two minutes before the end. When the next World Cup was held a year later in Mexico, Denmark decided to make a selection from all Danish clubs and only from players with Danish citizenship. Ševčíková and Mandíková, who were still Czechoslovak citizens at the time, lost their participation in the tournament this time.

== Tennis career ==
Marie Ševčíková started playing tennis in Rokycany, before she was invited by coach Vilém Marzin to play football for Slavia Prague in September 1966. Ševčíková worked at the Kovo Rokycany club, where she managed to break through to the top thirty tennis players in the whole country as a junior. She continued to play tennis after her arrival in Prague in 1966, playing for the club TJ Motorlet (now I. ČLTK Prague). Ševčíková continued to be active in tennis even after her move abroad, both in Denmark and Italy. After her professional football career ended in 1975, she played for the Rødovre Tennisklub, for which Henrik Klitvad, later president of the Danish Tennis Federation, also played at the time. On the courts she also played against Anne-Mette Sørensen, winner of 26 Danish national championships and the 1972-82 Danish Fed Cup representative, where she served as non-playing captain until 1991 after her career ended. She also played and became friends with the most successful Norwegian tennis player of all time, Ellen Grindvold.
