= Rudolf Böttger =

Austrian painter

- Born: 4 July 1887; Tachov, Austria-Hungary
- Died: 28 January 1973 (aged 85); Regensburg, Germany
- Occupation: Painter

Rudolf Böttger (4 July 1887 – 28 January 1973) was an Austrian painter. His work was part of the painting event in the art competition at the 1936 Summer Olympics.
