= Alfred II, Prince of Windisch-Grätz =

Austrian military officer and landowner

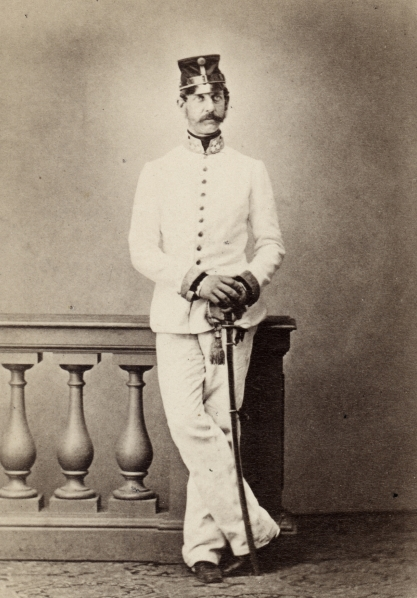
Alfred II. Windisch-Grätz

Alfred Josef Nikolaus Guntram, II Prince of Windisch-Grätz (28 March 1819 – 28 April 1876) was a Feldmarschall-Lieutenant in the Austrian Imperial army and a major landowner.

== Early life ==
Alfred II was born on 28 March 1819 in Vienna, into the House of Windisch-Graetz, one of the most prominent Austrian noble families. He was the eldest son of Alfred I, Prince of Windisch-Grätz, Field Marshal in the Imperial Austrian Army, and his wife, Princess Maria Eleonore of Schwarzenberg (1796–1848).

== Biography ==
Like his 3 brothers, Alfred II joined the Austrian Army. During the Prague Uprising of 1848, suppressed by his father, his mother was killed and he himself was wounded.

As his father's wing adjutant, he accompanied him in all his military campaigns. When his father died in 1862, he became 2nd Prince of Windisch-Grätz.

In the Austro-Prussian War of 1866, he commanded two regiments in the decisive Battle of Königgrätz, which ended in defeat for Austria. He was seriously wounded by a stomach shot in the battle at Stresitz and taken prisoner. After his release, Alfred retired from active duty and received several military awards and the Golden Fleece in 1866. He became military commander in Pressburg in 1869.

Never fully recovered from his wounds, Alfred II died aged 57 at Tachov Castle, the Bohemian family seat of the Windisch-Grätz.

== Personal life ==
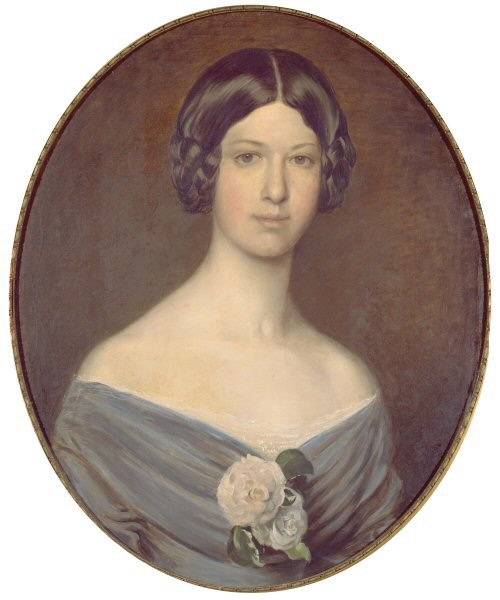
His wife, Princess Hedwig of Lobkowicz

On 19 October 1850, he married his cousin Princess Hedwig of Lobkowicz (1829–1852), the eldest daughter of Prince August Longin Josef of Lobkowicz (1797-1848), Governor of Lombardy, and his wife, Princess Bertha of Schwarzenberg (1807-1883). She died 2 years after the marriage. Their only child was:

- Alfred III, Prince of Windisch-Grätz (1851–1927), Minister-President of Austria.

== Sources ==
- BLKÖ
- * Hannes Stekl, Marija Wakounig: Windisch-Graetz. Ein Fürstenhaus im 19. und 20. Jahrhundert. Böhlau, Wien 1992, ISBN 3-205-05468-7.
- Frank Raberg: Biographisches Handbuch der württembergischen Landtagsabgeordneten 1815–1933. Im Auftrag der Kommission für geschichtliche Landeskunde in Baden-Württemberg. Kohlhammer, Stuttgart 2001, ISBN 3-17-016604-2, Page 1022.
