= Battle of Tachov =

1427 battle of the Hussite Wars

Coordinates: 49°47′43″N 12°37′59″E

- Part of the Third anti-Hussite crusade, Hussite Wars
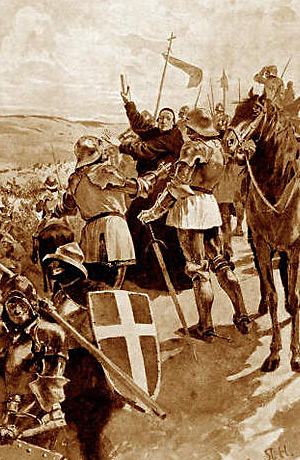
- Papal legate Henry Beaufort trying to halt fleeing crusaders after the battle
Date	3 – 4 August 1427
Location	Tachov, western Bohemia
Result	Hussite victory

Belligerents
Hussite coalition; Orphans; Taborites; Praguers; Bohemian Hussite nobility	Crusade; Holy Roman Empire; Margraviate of Brandenburg; Electoral Palatinate; Bohemian Catholic nobility within Landfrieden of Pilsen; Duchy of Bavaria-Landshut; Electorate of Saxony; Electorate of Trier; Landgraviate of Thuringia; Teutonic Order; Kingdom of England

Commanders and leaders
Prokop the Great	Henry Beaufort; Otto von Ziegenhain; Frederick I of Brandenburg; Johann of Neumarkt

Strength
17,500; 200 War wagons	20,000

Casualties and losses
Unknown	Heavy; 900–1,400 captured

The Battle of Tachov (German: Schlacht bei Tachau) or Battle of Mies (German: Schlacht bei Mies) was fought on 4 August 1427 near the Bohemian towns of Tachov (Tachau) and Stříbro (Mies).

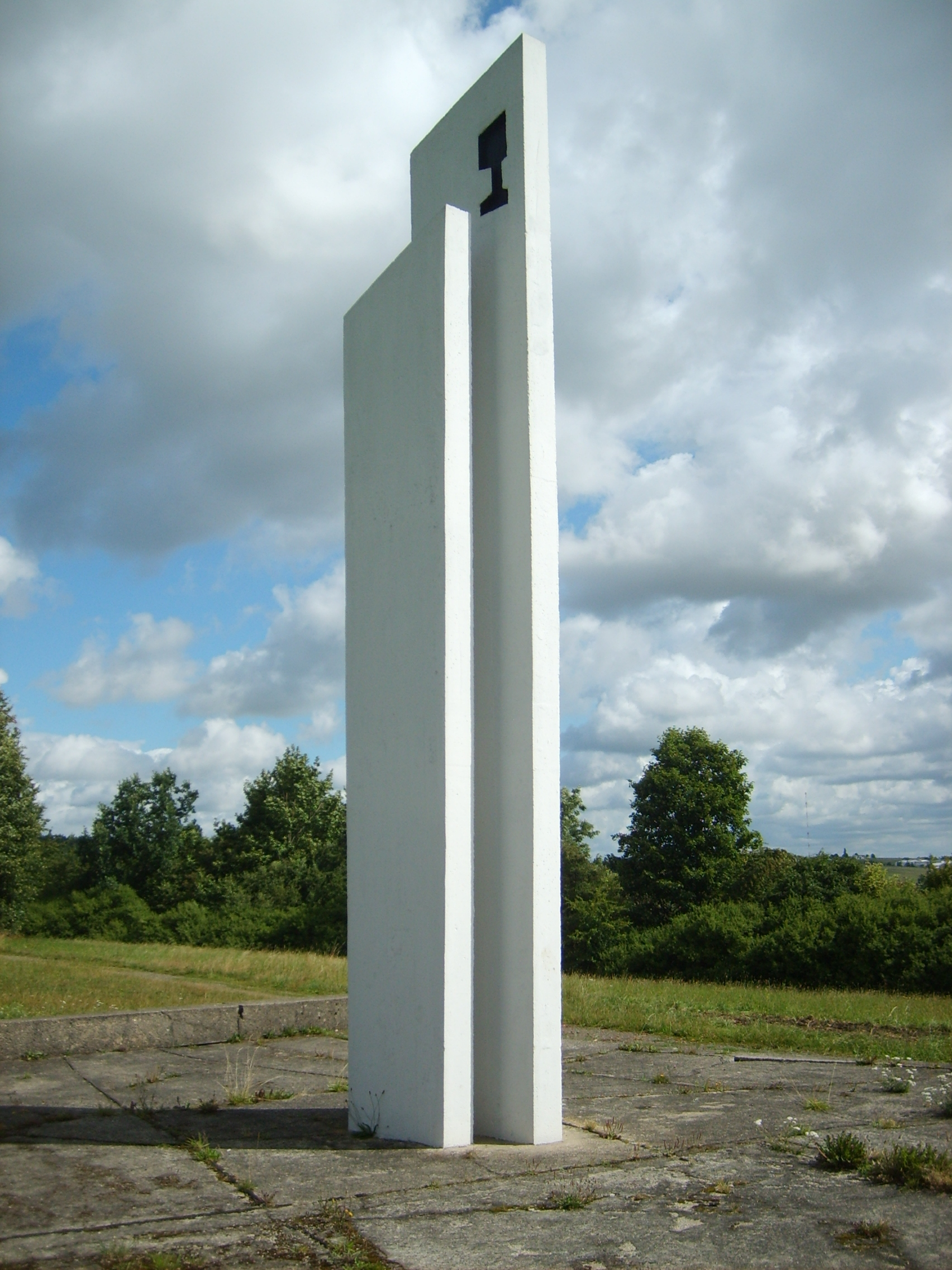
The Battle of Tachov monument

It was part of the Hussite Wars, and it was the first battle in which war wagons were used by the crusaders. The battle showed that the wagenburg could not be used successfully by just any army. It took an army that knew how to use the wagons to make them successful. This battle ended the Fourth Crusade of the Hussite Wars, and for four years no further crusades were made. This would allow the Hussites to go on their "beautiful rides" into Hungary, Saxony, Bavaria and Silesia.
