= Joseph Nicholas of Windisch-Graetz =

Austrian nobleman (1744–1802)

Joseph Nicholas
- Count of Windisch-Graetz; Baron of Waldstein and Thal
- Born: 6 December 1744
- Died: 24 January 1802 (aged 57); Štěkeň
- Noble family: Windisch-Graetz
- Spouses: Maria Josepha Reinharda Raimunda Countess Erdödy Maria Leopoldine Franziska of Arenberg (m. 1781; died 1802)
- Issue: Sophie Luise, Princess of Löwenstein-Wertheim-Rosenberg; Alfred I, Prince of Windisch-Grätz; Weriand, 1st Prince of Windisch-Graetz
- Father: Leopold Carl Joseph of Windish-Graetz
- Mother: Maria Antonia Josepha of Khevenhüller

Joseph Louis Nicholas, Count of Windisch-Graetz, Baron of Waldstein and Thal (6 December 1744 – 24 January 1802) was a nobleman, a member of the House of Windisch-Graetz, and was chamberlain to Archduchess Marie Antoinette of Austria.

== Early life ==
He was the second son of Count Leopold Carl Joseph of Windish-Graetz (1718–1746) and his wife Countess Maria Antonia Josepha von Khevenhüller (1726–1746). As his father died young, he was the heir of his grandfather, Count Leopold Johann Victorin Windisch-Graetz. However, the estate was heavily indebted, forcing him to sell Červená Lhota Castle in Southern Bohemia to the Barons of Gudenus in 1755 and the Trautmannsdorf an der Leitha estate in Lower Austria in 1756.

== Career ==
On 12 May 1781, he purchased the lordships of Tachov, Ctěnice, and Štěkeň from Ernestine Fuchs von Bimbach, the widow of Count Adam Philipp Losy von Losinthal. Here he founded his extensive family archive. His descendants later moved this archive to the former Kladruby monastery, which they had acquired after it had been secularized.

== Personal life ==
Joseph Nicholas was twice married. His first wife was Countess Maria Josepha Reinharda Raimunda Erdödy de Monyorókerék et Monoszló (1748–1777) She died on 10 April 1777.

On 30 August 1781 in Brussels, he married his second wife, Duchess Maria Leopoldine Franziska of Arenberg (1751–1812), the daughter of vastly wealthy Charles Marie Raymond, 5th Duke of Arenberg. Together, they were the parents of:

- Count Ludwig Robert of Windisch-Graetz (1782–1783), who died young.
- Countess Sophie Luise Wilhelmine of Windisch-Graetz (1784–1848), who married Prince Karl of Löwenstein-Wertheim-Rosenberg, the son of Dominic Constantine, Prince of Löwenstein-Wertheim-Rochefort, and Princess Leopoldine of Hohenlohe-Waldenburg-Bartenstein, in 1799.
- Alfred Candidus Ferdinand of Windisch-Graetz (1787–1862), who married Princess Marie Eleonore Philippine Luise of Schwarzenberg, was daughter of Prince Josef Johann of Schwarzenberg and Duchess Pauline of Arenberg; he was raised to the rank of prince in 1804. His wife was murdered during 1848 Revolution.
- Weriand Alois Leopold Ulrich Johann Paul of Windisch-Graetz (1790–1867), who married Princess Maria Eleonore Karolina von Lobkowicz, a daughter of Joseph Franz Maximilian, 7th Prince of Lobkowicz, in 1812; he was raised to the rank of prince in 1822.

Count Joseph Nicholas died on 24 January 1802 in Štěkeň. His widow, Duchess Maria Leopoldine Franziska, died on 26 August 1812.
