= Alfred I, Prince of Windisch-Grätz =

Austrian nobleman and general

General Prince Alfred Candidus Ferdinand zu Windischgrätz
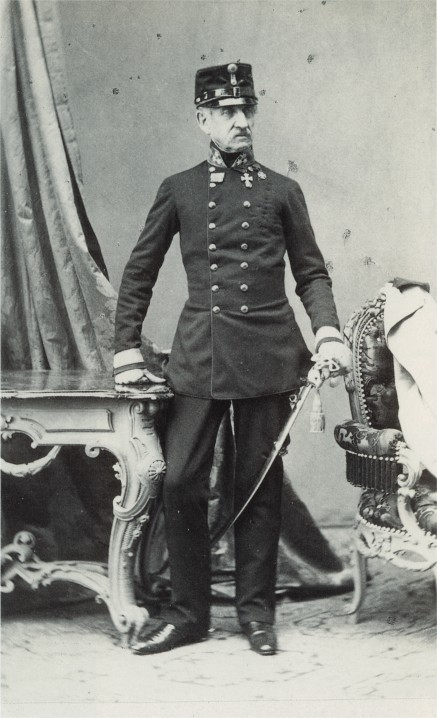
- Born: 11 May 1787; Brussels, Austrian Netherlands
- Died: 21 March 1862 (aged 74); Vienna, Austrian Empire
- Military career
- Allegiance: Austrian Empire
- Conflicts: Napoleonic Wars; Battle of Leipzig; Siege of Prague; Hungarian Revolution of 1848; Battle of Schwechat; Siege of Vienna; Battle of Kápolna; Battle of Isaszeg

Alfred I
- Prince of Windischgrätz
- Born: 11 May 1787; Brussels, Austrian Netherlands
- Died: 21 March 1862 (aged 74); Vienna
- Noble family: Windisch-Graetz
- Spouse: Princess Eleonore of Schwarzenberg
- Issue: Alfred II, Prince of Windisch-Grätz; Victorin Leopold Karl Prinz zu Windischgrätz; Joseph Alois Niclas Fürst Windischgrätz; Ludwig von Windischgrätz; August Joseph Nicolaus Windischgrätz
- Father: Joseph Nicholas of Windisch-Graetz
- Mother: Duchess Maria Leopoldine Franziska of Arenberg

General Alfred Candidus Ferdinand, Prince of Windischgrätz (German: Alfred Candidus Ferdinand Fürst zu Windischgrätz; 11 May 1787 – 21 March 1862), a member of an old Austro-Bohemian House of Windischgrätz, was a field marshal in the Austrian army. He is most noted for his service during the Napoleonic Wars and for his role in suppressing the Revolutions of 1848 in the Austrian Empire.

== Early life and ancestry ==
Originally from Styria, the Windischgrätz dynasty had received Inkolat rights of nobility by the Bohemian Crown in 1574.

Alfred was born in Brussels, then capital of the Austrian Netherlands, the son of Count Joseph Nicholas of Windischgrätz (1744–1802) and his second wife, Duchess Maria Leopoldine Franziska of Arenberg (1751–1812).

With the help of his mother's rich dowry, the family took its residence at Tachau (Tachov), the lordship having been purchased by Alfred's father in 1781.

== Napoleon ==
He started service in the Habsburg imperial army in 1804. As an Austrian army officer he distinguished himself throughout the wars fought by the Habsburg Monarchy in the 19th century.

Windisch-Grätz participated in every war against Napoleon and fought with distinction at the Battle of Leipzig and in the campaign of 1814. In 1833, he was named Field Marshal-Lieutenant (German: Feldmarschall-leutnant).

== Bohemia ==
In 1840, Prince Windischgrätz was appointed as military commander of the city of Prague. Eight years later, during the initial uprisings of the Vienna revolution he was temporarily granted military control of the army surrounding the city, and favoured subduing the revolting citizenry by force. However, facing hostility from government ministers within the city who favoured compromise, he was compelled to retire and return to his position in Prague, the incident causing him to be viewed in an unpopular light by the Austrian population at large and garnering a lot of negative press amongst the population of Prague.

Nevertheless, the events of Vienna left a firm impression on the Prince, who witnessed first hand the consequences of being ill-prepared for a popular insurrection and made moves to take the necessary precautions within the city he was governing. Over the following month of April he proceeded to beef up the military presence within Prague, increasing the number of soldiers and fortifying strategic positions throughout the city. This only further angered the population of Prague who viewed his precautions with hostility and suspicion. The city, being in a state of increase excitement due to the revolutionary chaos across the European continent during 1848.

On the 7th of June, a large group amassed to petition for the Princes dismissal. 3 days later an even larger meeting consisting of many students and citizens gathered to demand the withdrawal of soldiers from their strategic positions and a request for 2000 muskets and 80,000 cartridges, and a single battery for personal use by the cities population. A deputation of students were sent to wait on Windischgrätz for his response, put he refused to grant the petition. In compliance with deputation and the wishes of the civil governor of the city Count Thun however, he did removed an artillery battery from Joseph's Barracks within the city to the Hradshin, which the population felt particularly threatened by.

By now however, civil disturbances within the city were only increasing and by the 12th of June the discontent was reaching a boiling point. Citizens were insulting soldiers in the streets and fights between the military and armed revolutionaries were breaking out all over the city as the population built up barricades. An attempt by Archduke Ferdinand to pacify the situation failed as, appearing in the streets with several other city officials urging the population to put down their weapons, the city mayor Prince Lubkowitz was shot at and his aid Lieutenant Gustaker had a horse killed under him. The city was now in full revolt against imperial authority.

At this time in the evening Windischgrätz's wife was killed within her own house, dying by a shot discharged from the upper windows of the hotel named "The Golden Angel", which was immediately opposite to the quarters of the general commandant. A few moments after this event, Windischgrätz descended from his office into the streets and addressed the large crowd of citizens:

"Gentlemen, if the object of this vile serenade is to insult me as an individual, because I belong to the aristocracy, then you should go before my own hotel, where, unmolested, you may gratify your desire; but if, in making the demonstration before this building, you design to cast contempt upon the military commander of the city, I warn you that I shall punish such an attempt by every means in my power. Notwithstanding my wife lies now behind me in her blood, I conjure you in all kindness to depart, and not compel me to use against you all the force and power at my command."

Once he was finished his speech several members of the crowd rushed up and seized him, hurrying him to the nearest lamppost where a cord was prepared to hang him. He was quickly saved by the intervention of his soldiers and he then declared martial law throughout Bohemia.

== Hungary ==
Appointed to the chief command against the Hungarian revolutionaries under Lajos Kossuth, he gained some early successes and reoccupied Buda and Pest (January 1849), but by his slowness in pursuit he allowed the enemy to rally in superior numbers and to prevent an effective concentration of the Austrian forces.

In April 1849 he was relieved of his command after being defeated by Artúr Görgei during the Battle of Isaszeg. After his defeat he rarely appeared again in public life.

== Personal life ==
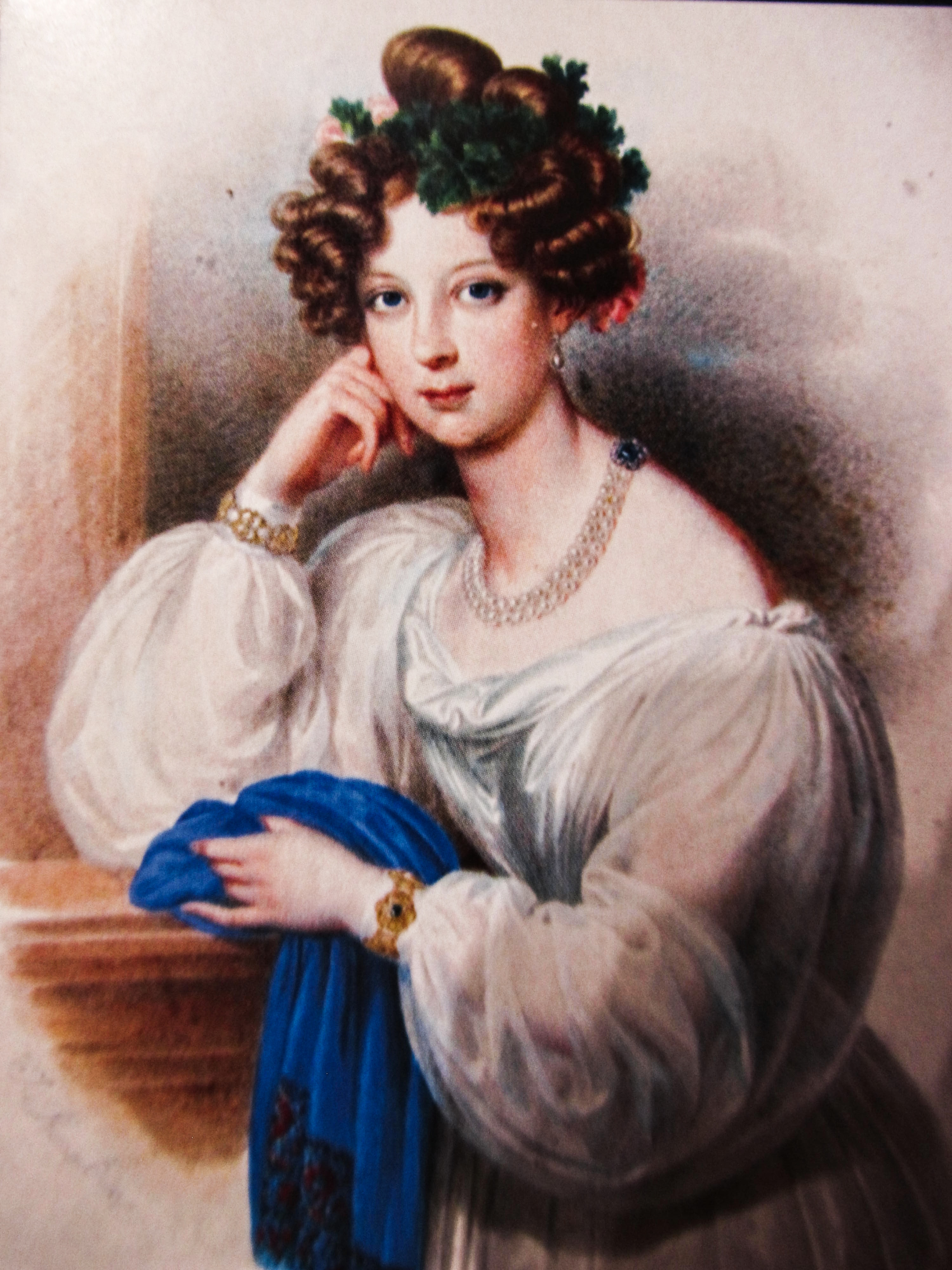
His wife, Princess Eleonore of Schwarzenberg

On 15 June 1817 he married his cousin, Princess Eleonore of Schwarzenberg (1796–1848), who was shot dead during 1848 Revolution. She was daughter of Prince Josef Johann of Schwarzenberg and his wife, Duchess Pauline of Arenberg (1774–1810). They had seven children, five sons and two daughters.

== Quotes ==
(In reference to rebellious constitutionalists) "They do not want to hear about the Grace of God? They will hear the grace of the cannon."

== Honours ==
He received the following orders and decorations:

- Kingdom of Bavaria: Knight of St. Hubert, 1806
- Russian Empire:
  - Knight of St. Vladimir, 3rd Class, 10 December 1813
  - Knight of St. George, 4th Class, 25 February 1814
  - Knight of St. Alexander Nevsky, 1833; in Diamonds
  - Knight of St. Andrew, in Diamonds, 1848; with Swords, 1855
- Sovereign Military Order of Malta: Grand Cross of Honour and Devotion
- Austrian Empire:
  - Knight of the Military Order of Maria Theresa, 1814; Grand Cross, 1850
  - Knight of the Golden Fleece, 1830
  - Grand Cross of St. Stephen, 1848
- Kingdom of Hanover:
  - Grand Cross of the Hanoverian Guelphic Order, 1846
  - Knight of St. George, 1849
- Kingdom of Sardinia: Grand Cross of Saints Maurice and Lazarus, 1848
- Duchy of Parma: Senator Grand Cross of the Constantinian Order of St. George, 1849
- Holy See: Grand Cross of St. Gregory the Great
- Oldenburg: Grand Cross of the Order of Duke Peter Friedrich Ludwig, with Golden Crown, 1 June 1856
- Kingdom of Prussia:
  - Knight of the Black Eagle
  - Knight of the Red Eagle, 1st Class
- Grand Duchy of Tuscany: Grand Cross of the Military Order of St. Stephen Pope and Martyr

== Bibliography ==
- Fürst Windischgrätz. Eine Lebensskizze. Aus den Papieren eines Zeitgenossen der Sturm-Jahre 1848 und 1849 (2nd ed., Leipzig, 1898)
- Nobili, Johann. Hungary 1848: The Winter Campaign. Edited and translated Christopher Pringle. Warwick, UK: Helion & Company Ltd., 2021.
- Stiles, William Henry. Austria in 1848-49. Harper and Brothers., 1852.
