= Inkolat =

Inkolat is a term from the rights of the nobility. It was obtained by either birth or formal admission into the societies of knights and landed gentry in the old Austrian and Czech lands. Only in Lusatia there was no Inkolat; admission into the community of the state nobility was there much easier.

The award of the Inkolat conferred on the recipient the ability to purchase or acquire noble estates, the right to participate in the state councils, and the permission to apply for positions that were reserved for the members of the Estates. Until the Thirty Years War the award of the Inkolat was the only way to determine the status of a prospective candidate. After the failure of the Bohemian Revolt of 1618 and 1619 Emperor Ferdinand II reserved the right to confer the Inkolat with his Verneuerte Landesordnung [Renewed Constitution] of 1627. With the end of the feudal rights and privileges in 1848, the Inkolat lost most of its meaning and prestige.

== Literature ==
- (de) Christian d'Elvert: “Das Incolat, die Habilitirung zum Lande, die Erbhuldigung und der Intabulations-Zwang in Mähren und Oesterr.-Schlesien” [The Inkolat, the Qualifications of the Land, the Hereditary Privileges and the Compulsory Registration in Moravia and Austrian Silesia]. In: Notizenblatt der historisch-statistischen Section der Kais. königl. mährisch-schlesischen Gesellschaft zur Beförderung des Ackerbaues, der Natur- und Landeskunde [Journal of the Historical-Statistical Section of the Imperial and Royal Moravian-Silesian Society for the Promotion of Agriculture, Nature and Geography], 1882, pages 17–18, 29–32, 47–48, 51-55
- (de) Arnold Luschin von Ebengreuth: “Inkolat, Indigenat in den altösterreichischen Landen [Inkolat, Naturalization in the Old Austrian Lands]”. In: Ernst Mischler and Josef Ulbrich, eds.: Österreichisches Staatswörterbuch, 2. Band [Austrian State Dictionary, 2nd Volume], Vienna 1906, pp. 886 ff.
- (de) B. Rieger: Inkolat, Indigenat in Böhmen [Inkolat, Naturalization in Bohemia]. In: Ernst Mischler and Josef Ulbrich, eds.: Österreichisches Staatswörterbuch, 2. Band [Austrian State Dictionary, 2nd Volume], Vienna 1906, pp. 897 ff.
