= Tachov =

- Town
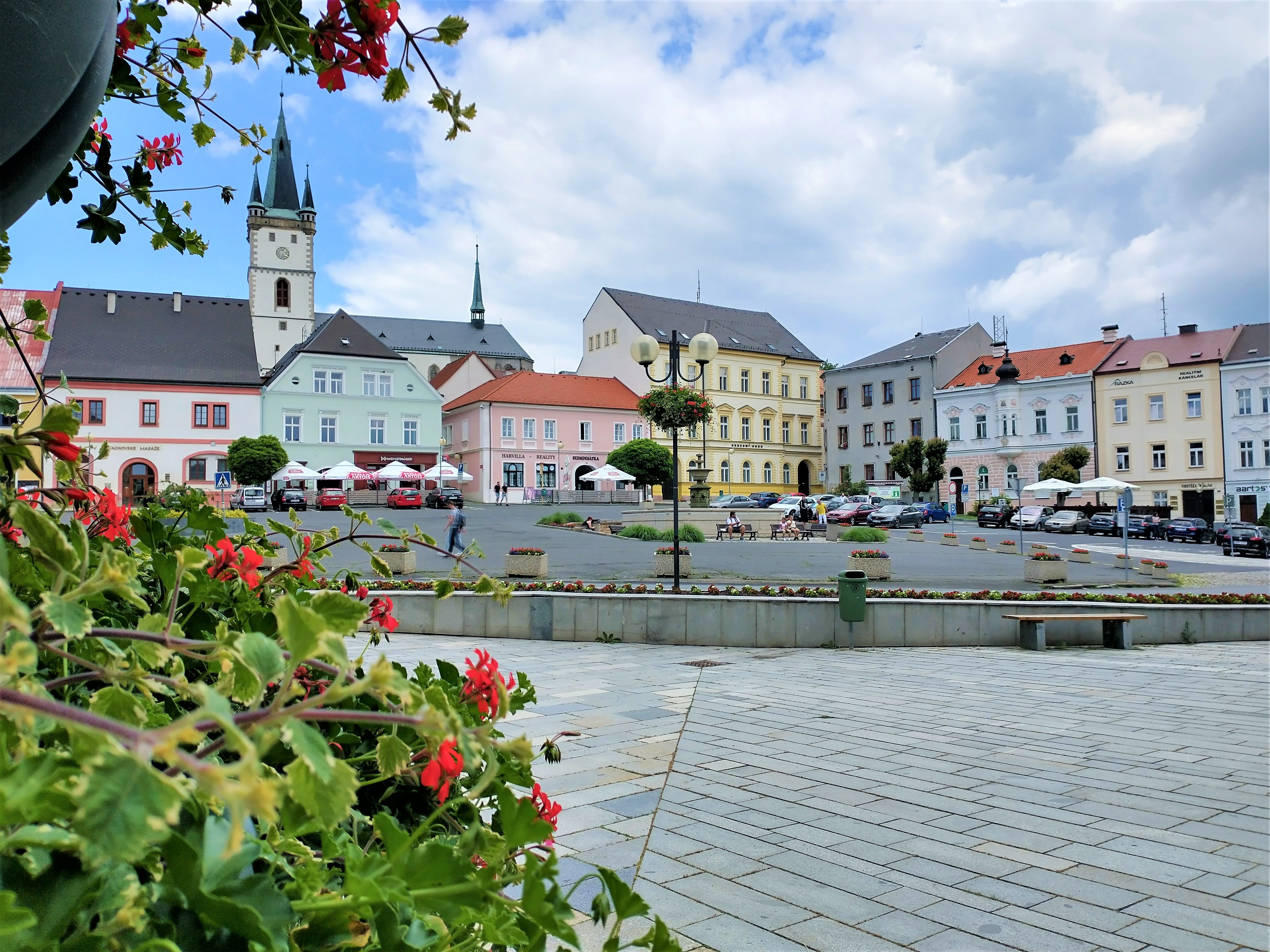
- Town square with the Church of the Assumption of the Virgin Mary in the background

- Flag Coat of arms

- Location in the Czech Republic
- Coordinates: 49°47′43″N 12°37′59″E
- Country: Czech Republic
- Region: Plzeň
- District: Tachov
- First mentioned: 1126

Government
  - Mayor: Petr Vrána

Area
  - Total: 40.84 km^{2} (15.77 sq mi)
- Elevation: 483 m (1,585 ft)

Population (2026-01-01)
  - Total: 14,308
  - Density: 350.3/km^{2} (907.4/sq mi)
- Time zone: UTC+1 (CET)
  - Summer (DST): UTC+2 (CEST)
- Postal code: 347 01
- Website: www.tachov-mesto.cz

Tachov (Czech pronunciation: [ˈtaxof]; German: Tachau) is a town in the Plzeň Region of the Czech Republic. It has about 14,000 inhabitants. The town is located on the Mže River in a hilly landscape.

The most notable noble owners of Tachov were the Windisch-Graetz family, which ruled the town from 1784. The historic town centre is well preserved and is protected as an urban monument zone. The main landmarks of Tachov include the riding hall in Tachov-Světce, protected as a national cultural monument, the medieval town walls, which are among the best-preserved wall systems in the country, and the Tachov Castle.

== Administrative division ==
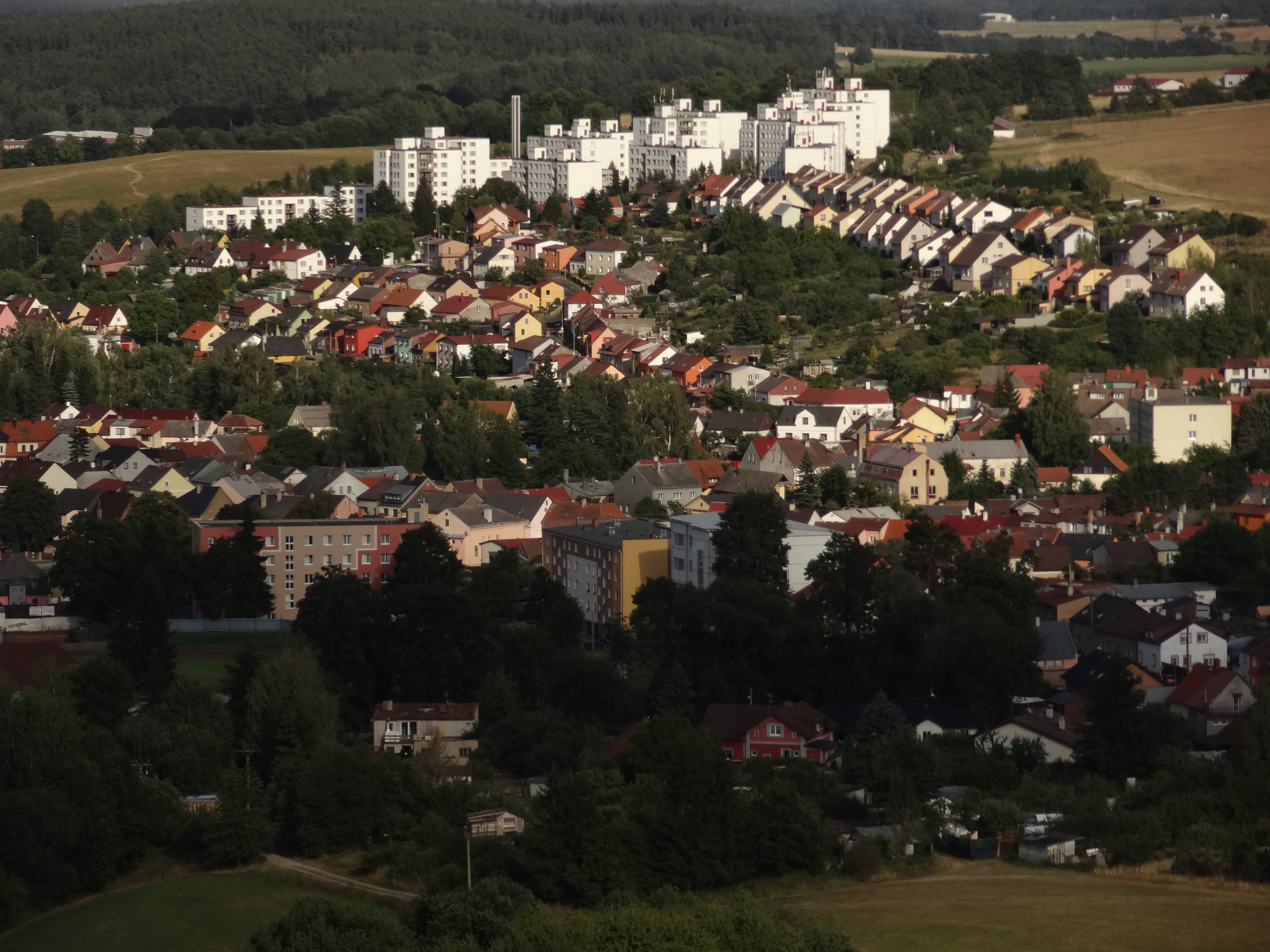
Southern part of Tachov

Tachov consists of nine municipal parts (in brackets population according to the 2021 census):

- Tachov (11,888)
- Bíletín (19)
- Malý Rapotín (76)
- Mýto (48)
- Oldřichov (171)
- Světce (58)
- Velký Rapotín (73)
- Vilémov (16)
- Vítkov (161)

== Etymology ==
The name is derived from the personal name Tach, meaning "Tach's (court)".

== Geography ==
Tachov is located about 53 km (33 mi) west of Plzeň. The eastern and central parts of the municipal territory with the town proper lie in the Podčeskoleská Hills. The western part lies in the Upper Palatinate Forest and includes the highest point of Tachov, the hill Světecký vrch at 616 m (2,021 ft) above sea level. The Mže River flows through the town.

== History ==
The area was inhabited by humans around 8,000–6,000 BCE. The first written mention of Tachov is from 1126. King Ottokar II of Bohemia (1233–1278) had built a new castle with a massive round stone tower there. He also founded a walled town near the castle.

During the Hussite Wars (1419–1434), the town was several times besieged and conquered. In 1427, Prokop the Great defeated the crusaders in the Battle of Tachov. The Thirty Years' War (1618–1648) damaged the town considerably. In 1664, Count Johann Anton Losy became the new proprietor. The Losy family began conversion of the medieval castle to a large Baroque residence. In 1784, the title passed to the Windisch-Graetz family. The Windisch-Graetzs, in their turn, rebuilt the house in the Neoclassical style at great expense.

Until 1918, Tachov – Tachau was part of Austria-Hungary, in the district of the same name, one of the 94 Bezirkshauptmannschaften in Bohemia.

In 1938, Tachov was annexed by Nazi Germany and administered as part of the Reichsgau Sudetenland. Most of the German-speaking population was expelled in 1945 according to the Beneš decrees. The area was only partly repopulated, mostly by Czechs and Slovaks, but also by Volhynian Czechs and Romanians. From November 1945 to 1989, uranium was mined in the vicinity of the town, which attracted labourers to work in the mines and helped the town grow.

== Demographics ==
There is a large Ukrainian community in Tachov, which includes both permanent residents and asylum seekers. The industrial zones based in and around Tachov attract many agency workers, especially Ukrainians, and to a lesser extent, Colombians, Filipinos, Mongolians and Kenyans. Including people who do not have permanent residence in the Czech Republic, the Tachov's population is around 40% foreign, which is the highest among Czech towns.

Historical population

Year	Pop.	±%
1869	5,433	—
1880	5,572	+2.6%
1890	5,680	+1.9%
1900	6,590	+16.0%
1910	7,814	+18.6%

Year	Pop.	±%
1921	7,902	+1.1%
1930	8,189	+3.6%
1950	4,843	−40.9%
1961	5,606	+15.8%
1970	8,435	+50.5%

Year	Pop.	±%
1980	11,847	+40.5%
1991	12,833	+8.3%
2001	12,696	−1.1%
2011	12,548	−1.2%
2021	12,510	−0.3%

Source: Censuses

== Transport ==
There are no major road passing through Tachov. The II/199 road connects the town with the D5 motorway and the Czech–German border.

Tachov is located on the Planá–Domažlice railway line of local importance.

== Sights ==
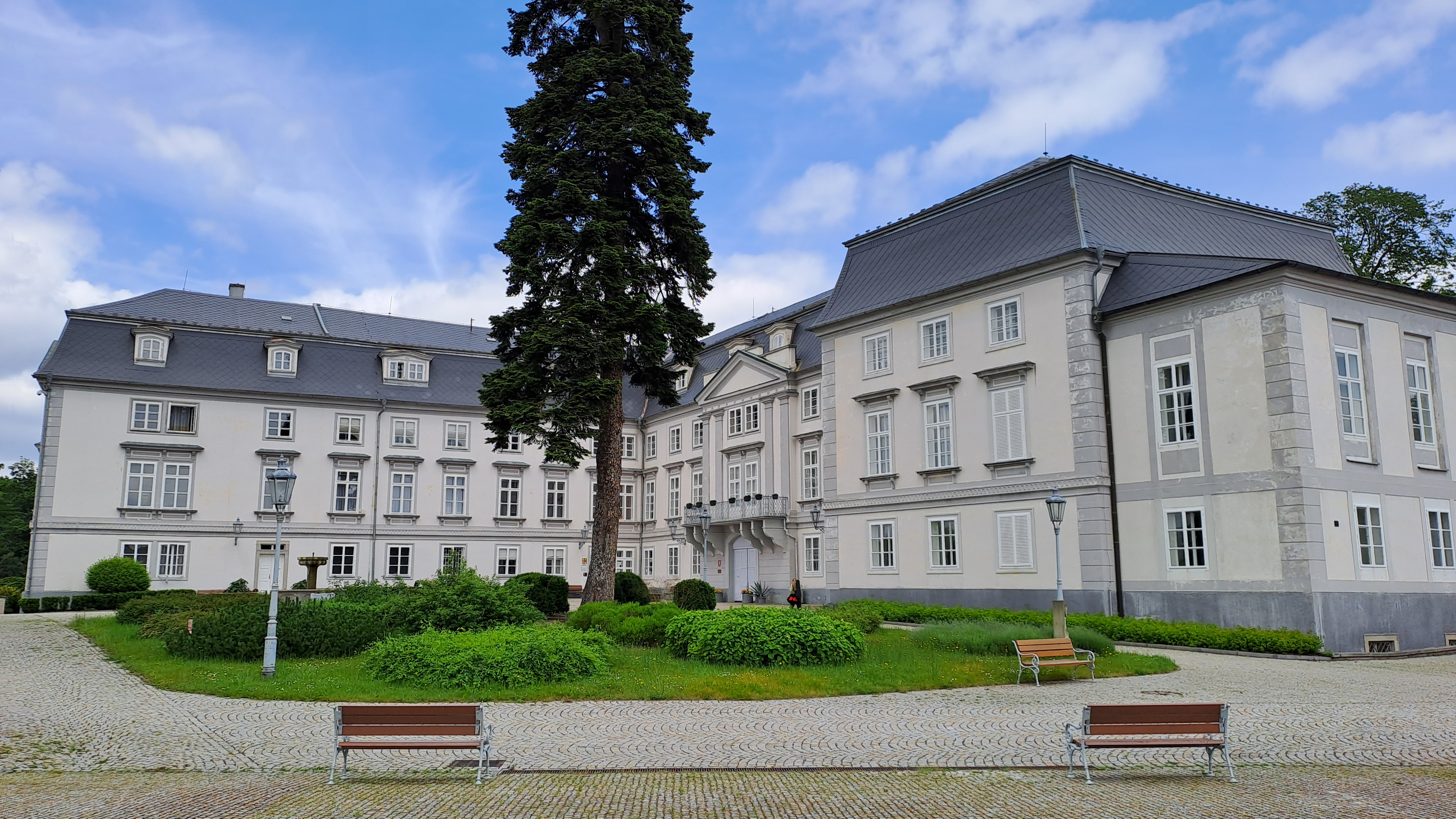
Tachov Castle

=== Castle and town fortifications ===
Around 1300, the town fortifications were built around the town. They gradually became a pride of Tachov, because they belong to the best-preserved wall systems in the country. The medieval town was enclosed by an 8–10 m high and 150 cm thick circular wall. There were 26 towers around the perimeter of the walls, which reached a height of 11–14 m. To this day, 21 towers or their fragments have been preserved.

The Tachov Castle with a cylindrical tower was built during the reign of Ottokar II. In 1802 the tower was taken down, and the Windisch-Graetz family built a Renaissance castle instead. The construction was finished in 1808 and the Windisch-Graetzs lived here until 1939. During World War II, the castle was used for civil and military purposes, but it was seriously ruined, so in 1968 there was the possibility of demolition. Eventually, the castle was saved and from 1969 to 1983 it was under reconstruction. Today, part of the building is used as a primary art school and the rest is open to the public.

=== Religious monuments ===
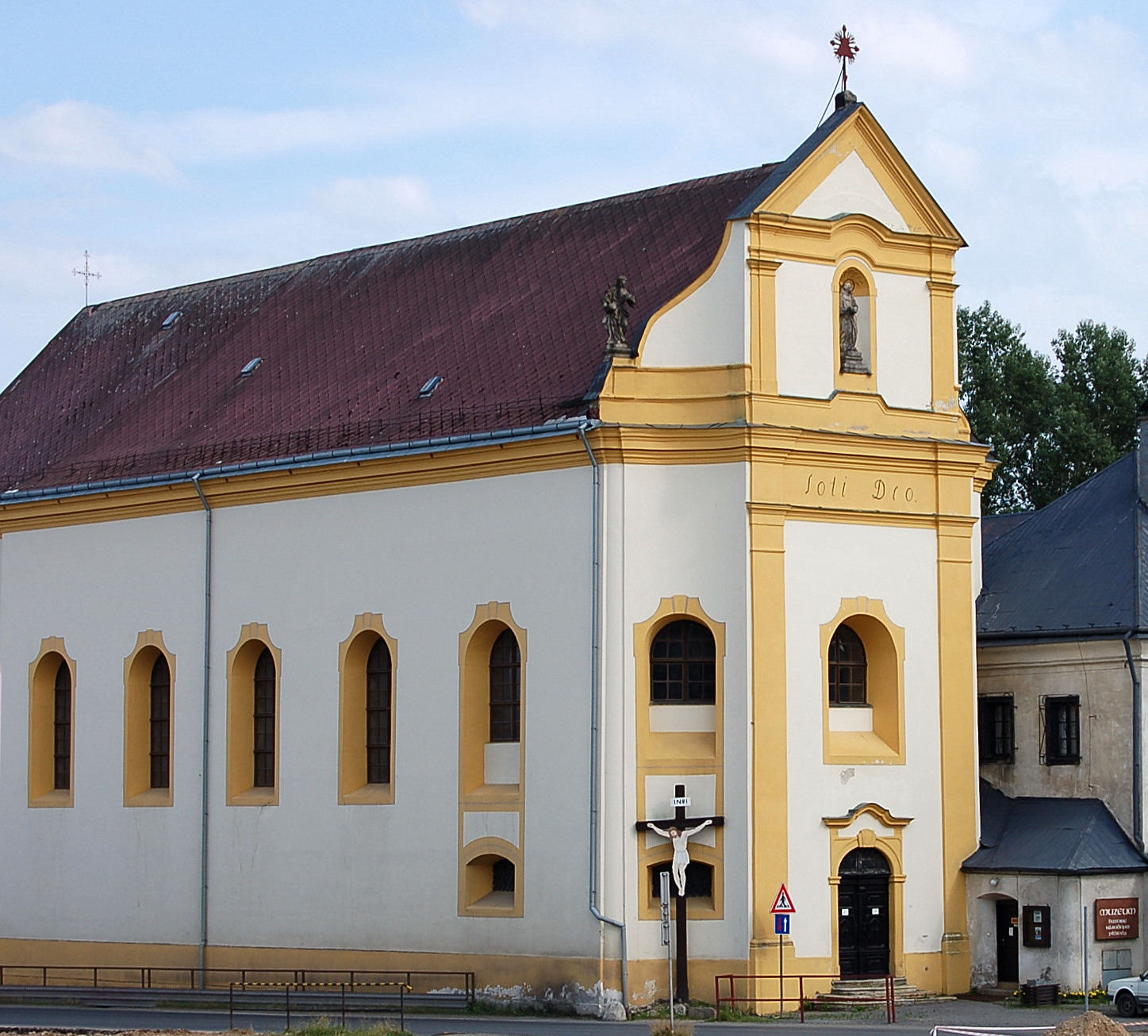
Former Franciscan monastery

The Church of the Assumption of the Virgin Mary was originally a Gothic church, but it went through many arrangements during the 14th century. The last reconstruction lasted from 1904 to 1908 and the church was rebuilt in Neo-Gothic style. The inside arrangements come from 1670. It does not have only the classical function of a church. Nowadays there are held many concerts during the year.

The Church of Saint Wenceslaus is the oldest church in Tachov and may antedate the town itself. In 1802 the Windisch-Graetzs bought it and they made it a family tomb. It is a simple building located in park, which replaced a former churchyard. There are still many tombstones of significant burgesses, who lived in Tachov during the 15th–18th centuries. In 1947 the Czechoslovak Hussite Church took over this place.

The former Franciscan monastery and the Church of Saint Mary Magdalene were founded in 1466 and since this year both buildings went through many reconstructions. The Italian architect Martino Allio made the first reconstruction in 1686–1694, and the most important one came in years 1745–1750. In 1945 bombs damaged the church and four years later it was closed. Since 1945, the monastery has been used as the Museum of the Upper Palatinate Forest, and it offers information about the history of Tachov and the region surrounding it. The museum is used for many activities and many expositions are held here every year.

The Jewish cemetery, founded in 1615, is located in the southern part of the town. There are 190 gravestones here, and the oldest preserved one is from 1700.

=== Světce ===
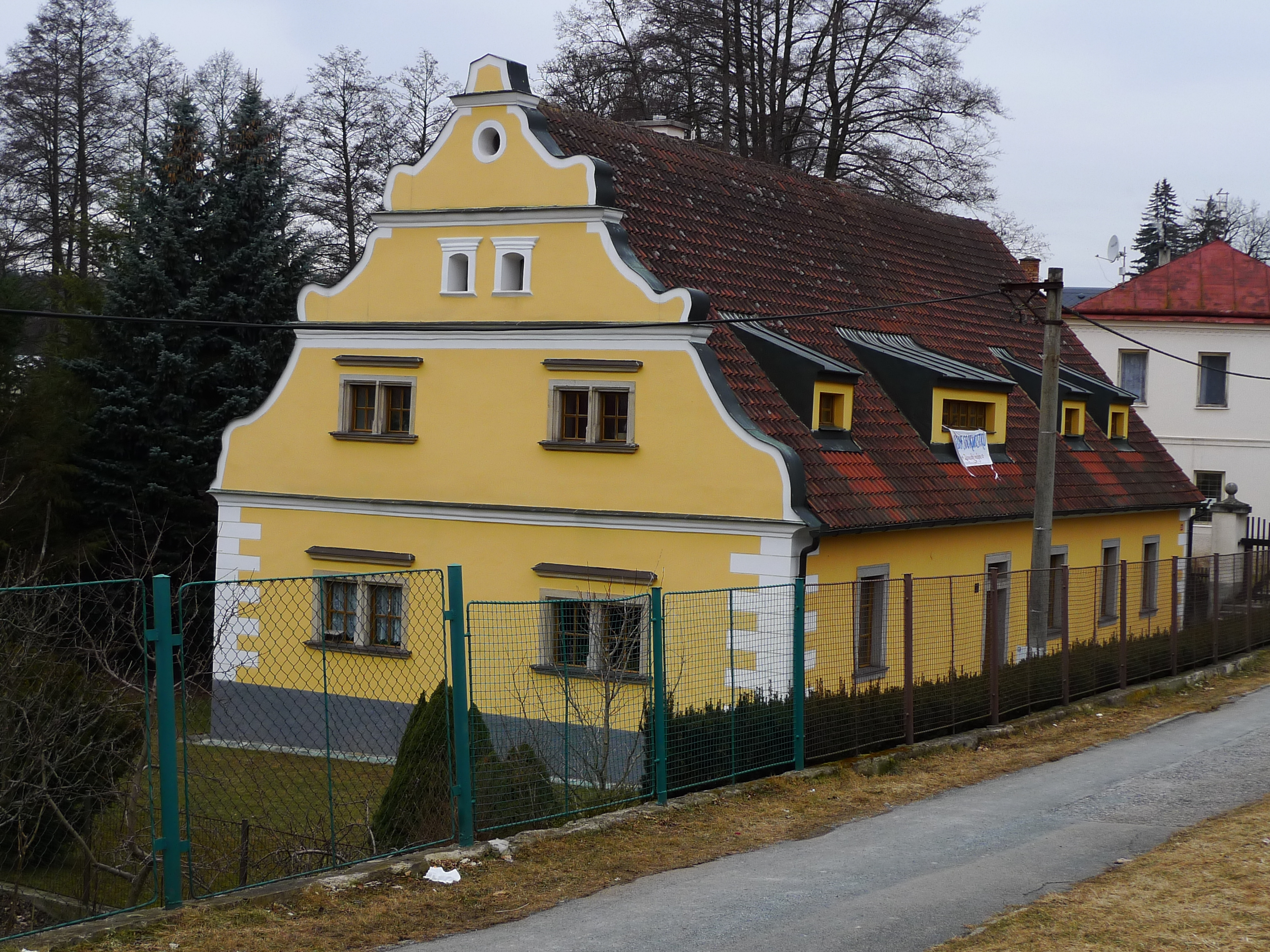
Husmann's Mill

Světce is a complex of three historical buildings. One of them is a monastery built in the 17th century. Josef II cancelled it and so in 1787 the Windisch-Graetzs bought it and rebuilt it as a castle. The castle that was finished in 1700 went down, and nowadays there are only remains of the walls and a small tower. The last one is a riding hall from the time of romanticism, which was built in the Neo-Romanesque style in 1858–1862. It is the second largest riding hall in Europe, after the Viennese riding hall, and is protected as a national cultural monument.

=== Other ===
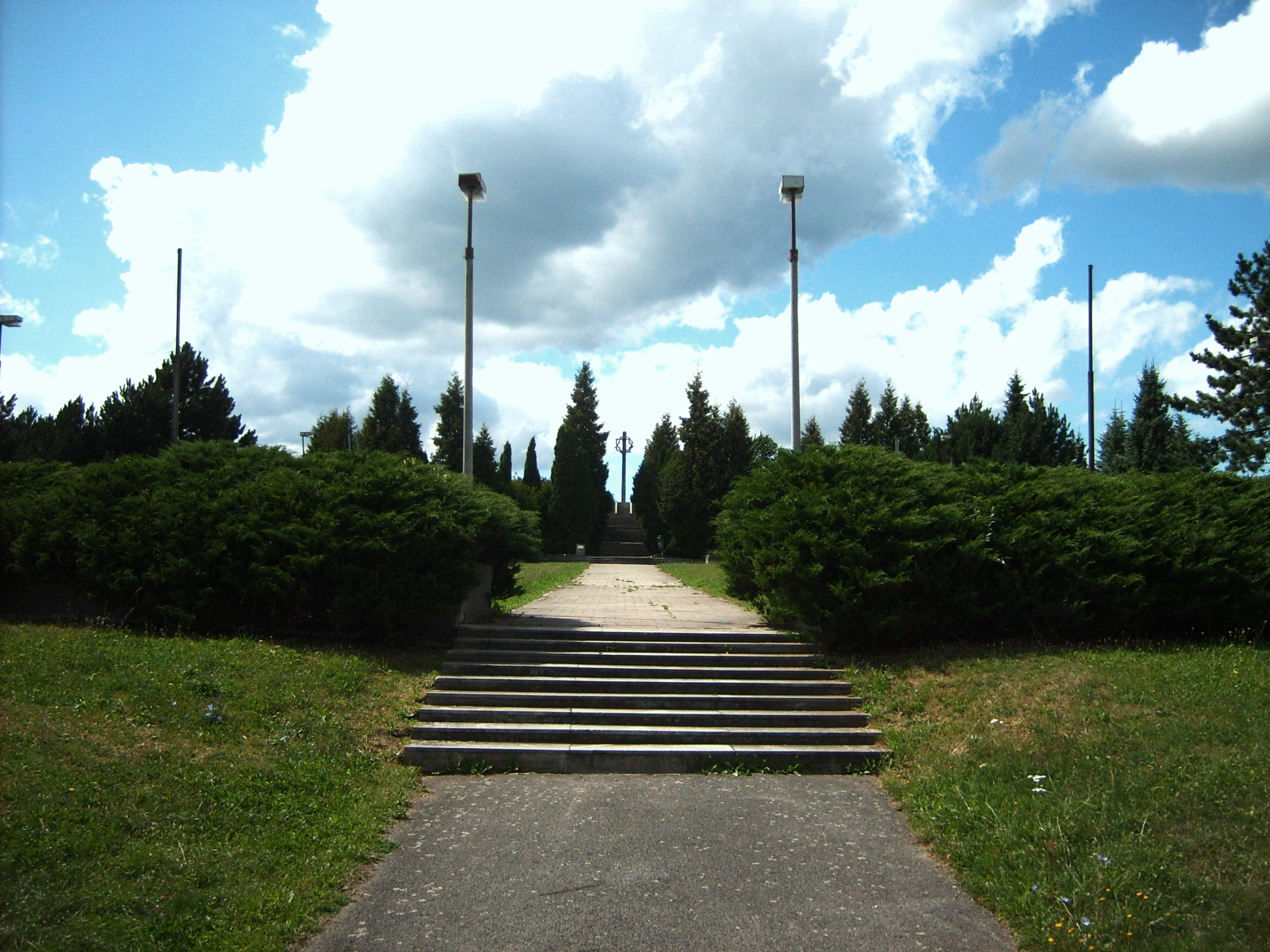
Mohyla memorial

Husmann's Mill is a Baroque mill founded by the regent Jan Filip Husmann in 1645. During the reconstruction in 2006–2007, a millwheel was restored. It is used by the Town Cultural Centre and the Tachov's Children Choir.

Vysoká is a 563 m (1,847 ft) high hill to the west of the town. There is a 25 m (82 ft) high observation tower on its top and a monument that commemorates the Battle of Tachov.

Mohyla is a memorial that commemorates the death of 232 people, who were killed during the death marches during the Holocaust in World War II.

== Notable people ==
- Moses Taku (13th century), rabbi and Tosafist
- Franz Rumpler (1848–1922), Austrian painter
- Mordecai Schornstein (1869–1949), Chief Rabbi of Copenhagen
- Rudolf Böttger (1887–1973), Austrian painter
- Karel Sperber (1910–1957), surgeon
