= Gračišće =

Gračišće Gallignana
- Municipality
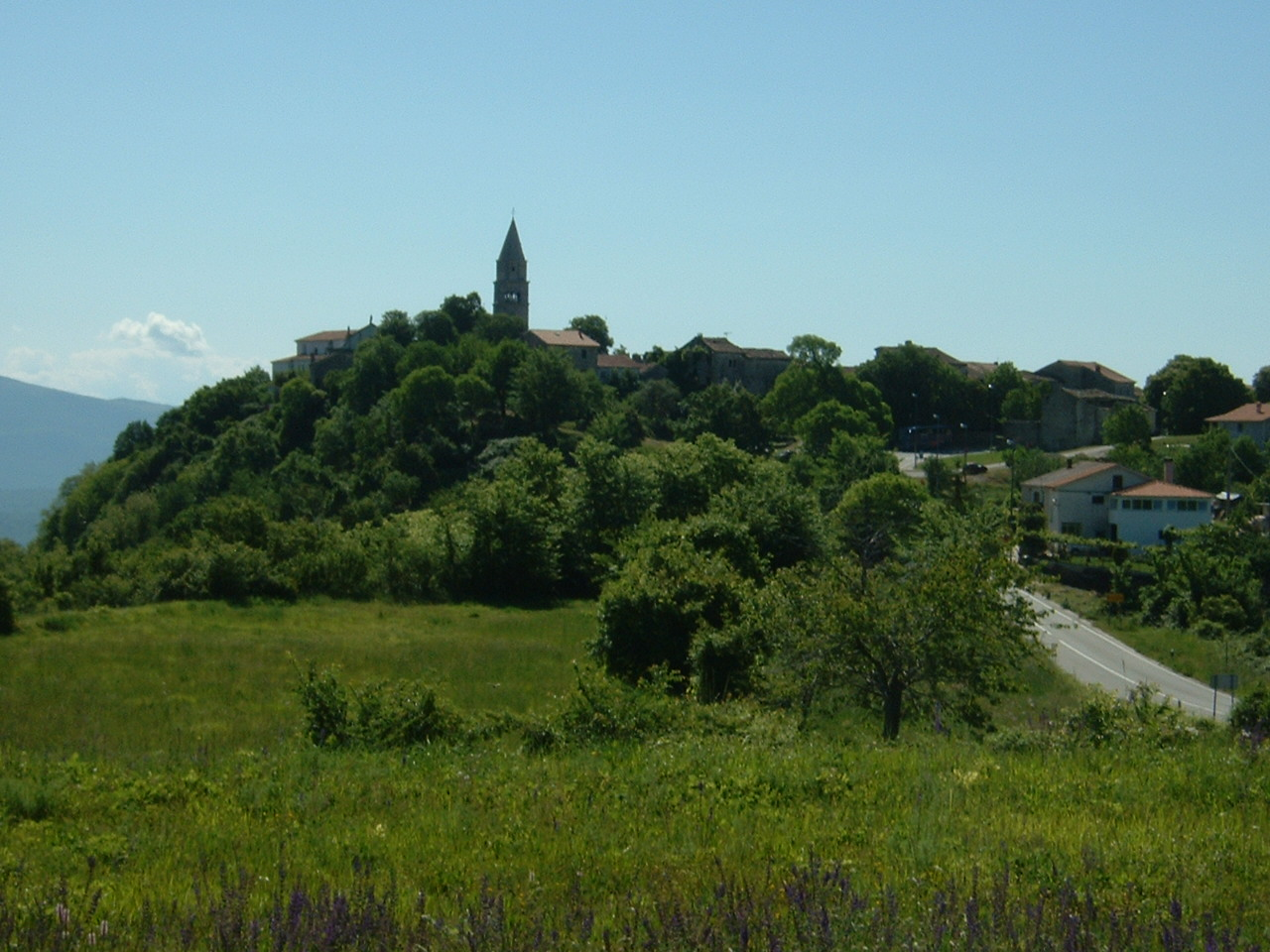
- Gračišće

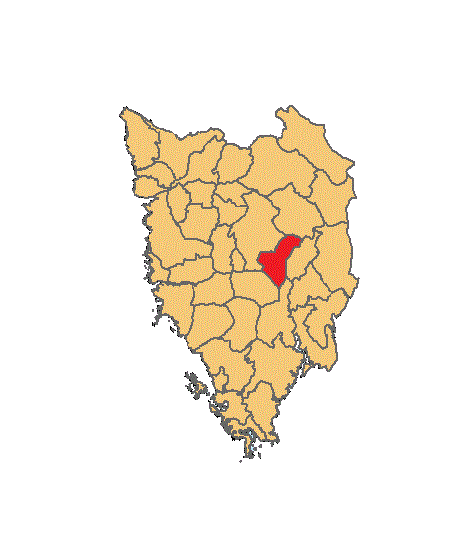
- Location of Gračišće in Istria
- Interactive map of Gračišće
- Location within Croatia
- Coordinates: 45°13′10″N 14°00′37″E
- Country: Croatia
- County: Istria County

Government
  - Mayor: Ivan Jeromela

Area
  - Municipality: 23.2 sq mi (60.1 km^{2})
  - Urban: 6.0 sq mi (15.6 km^{2})

Population (2021)
  - Municipality: 1,312
  - Density: 56.5/sq mi (21.8/km^{2})
  - Urban: 418
  - Urban density: 69.4/sq mi (26.8/km^{2})
- Time zone: UTC+1 (CET)
  - Summer (DST): UTC+2 (CEST)
- Postal code: 52000 Pazin
- Area code: 052
- Website: gracisce.hr

Gračišće (Italian: Gallignana) is a village and municipality of Istria County in Croatia.

== Geography ==
The municipality is located in the interior of the Istrian peninsula. The Gračišće village which is also the administrative centre of Gračišće municipality is located about 8 km (5.0 mi) east of the county seat Pazin, on the road to Kršan and Vozilići. It is seated on the top of the hill at an elevation of 457 m (1,499 ft) and has the overall appearance of a typical medieval Istrian town. The village stands completely under monumental protection. The old cemetery which is located in front of St. Vitus Church offers a panoramic view of inner Istria up to the Učka mountain range (1,402 m (4,600 ft)) in the east, as well as to the Julian Alps and the Dolomites in the north.

Between Gračišće and Pićan lies a protected landscape (1475 ha, protected since 1973) with unusual geological characteristics. Diverse landscape has been formed by erosion of marl, sandstone and limestone deposits with brook valleys formed in marl and hills formed from harder limestone which dominate the surrounding landscape.

== History ==
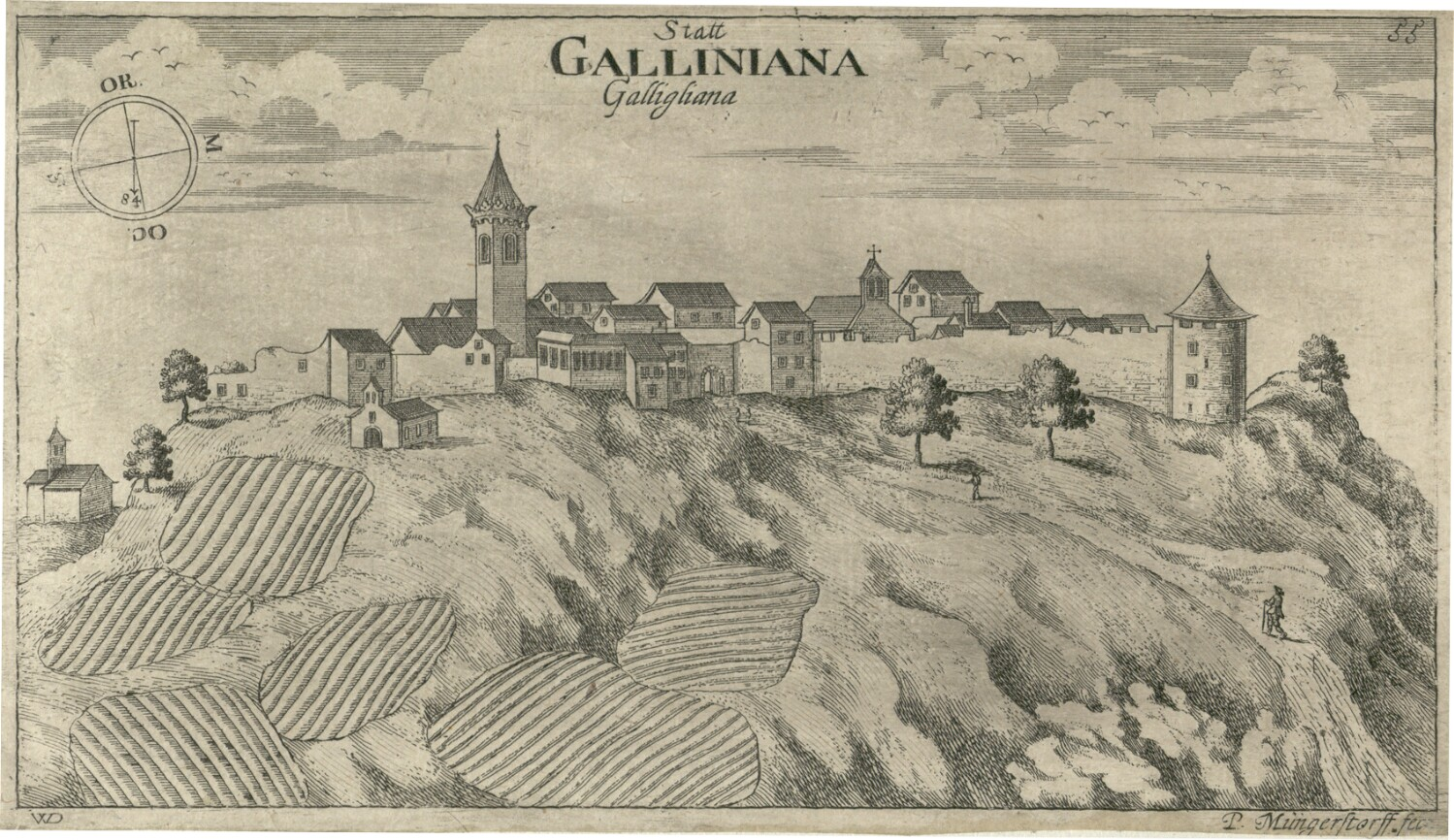
Gračišće in an engraving made by Valvasor from 1679.

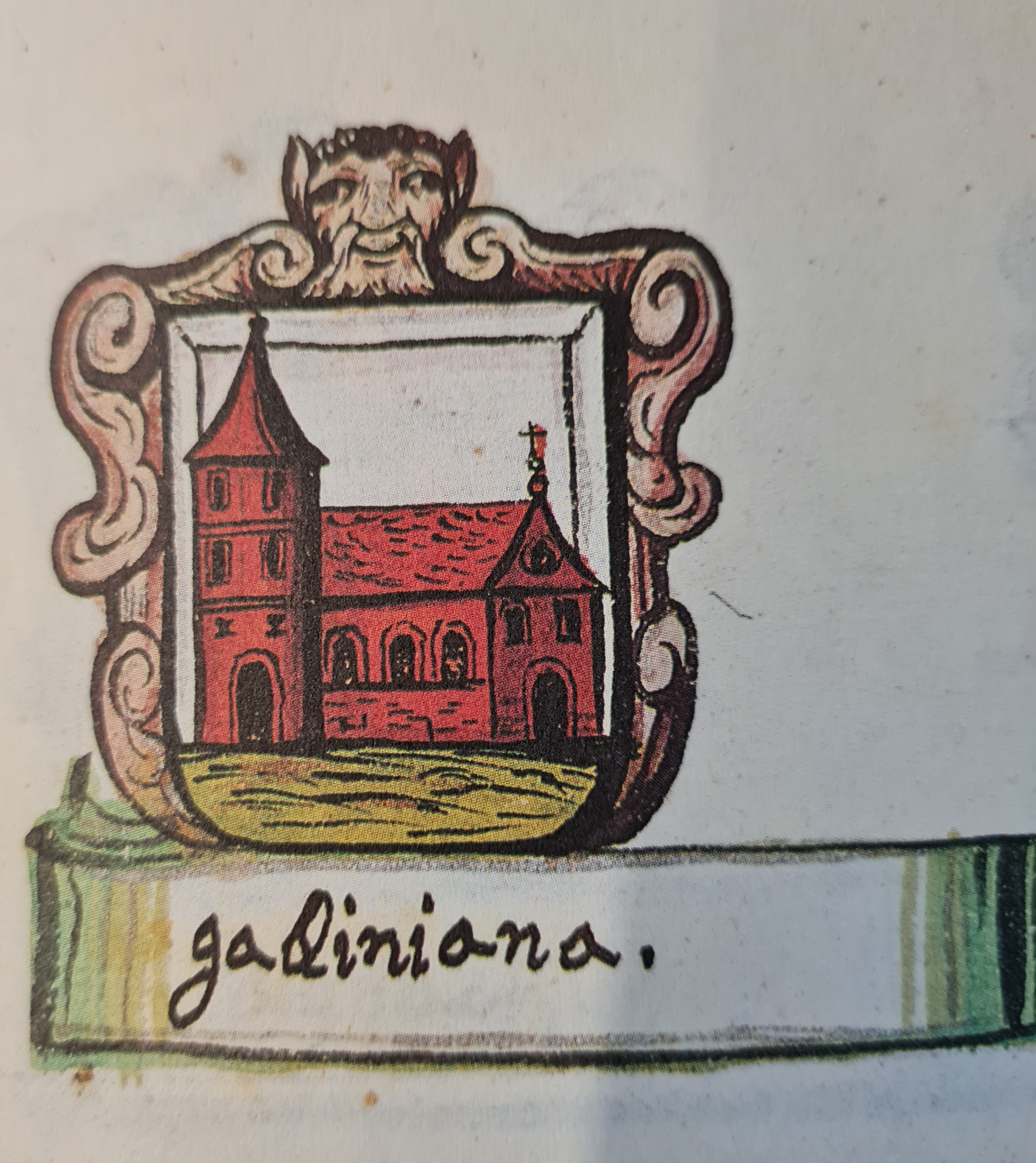
Gračišće coat of arms published in Opus Insignium Armorumque, Valvasor, 1687

The prehistory of Gračišće and its surroundings is poorly known. Due to its advantageous strategic position the area was almost surely settled and also played significant role already during the Bronze and Iron Age. There are just few findings located at Perunčevac, Perunovac, Osoje, Funčići, Bazgalji, with ceramics finds, and Salamunišće where a Bronze Age grave was found. In the Iron Age, Istria was settled with Illyrian tribes of Histri (west, south and central Istria) and Liburnians (in the eastern part).

After centuries of armed conflicts, the war between the Roman Empire and Histri tribes (Istria is named after them) ended with the fall of Nesactium in 177 BC. From then, Istria was subjected to Roman rule and was incorporated into the Tenth region of Italy), replaced with the Venetia et Histria province at the end of the 3rd century. The inner territory of Gračišće remained confined between coastal colonies but did not belong to them. After a while it became Imperial property and in the 3rd century it came under control of the revenue officials situated in Colonia Pietas Iulia Pola (present-day Pula). The strategic position of Gračišće grew more important during and after the 3rd and 4th century, when the surrounding hills became good defending positions. After 476 West Roman Empire fell but after 30 years Justinian I restored the Eastern Roman Empire, and the Byzantine Emperors ruled in Istria until 751.

In the Early Middle Ages, various 'barbarian' tribes like the Avars and the Lombards invaded Istria but remained only for brief periods, except for the Slavs who moved in from Pannonia and settled mostly in the interior. Istria became part of Francia under Charlemagne, whose son Carloman subjugated it in 788. From 803 the area was incorporated into the Carolingian march of Friuli and the Kingdom of Italy.

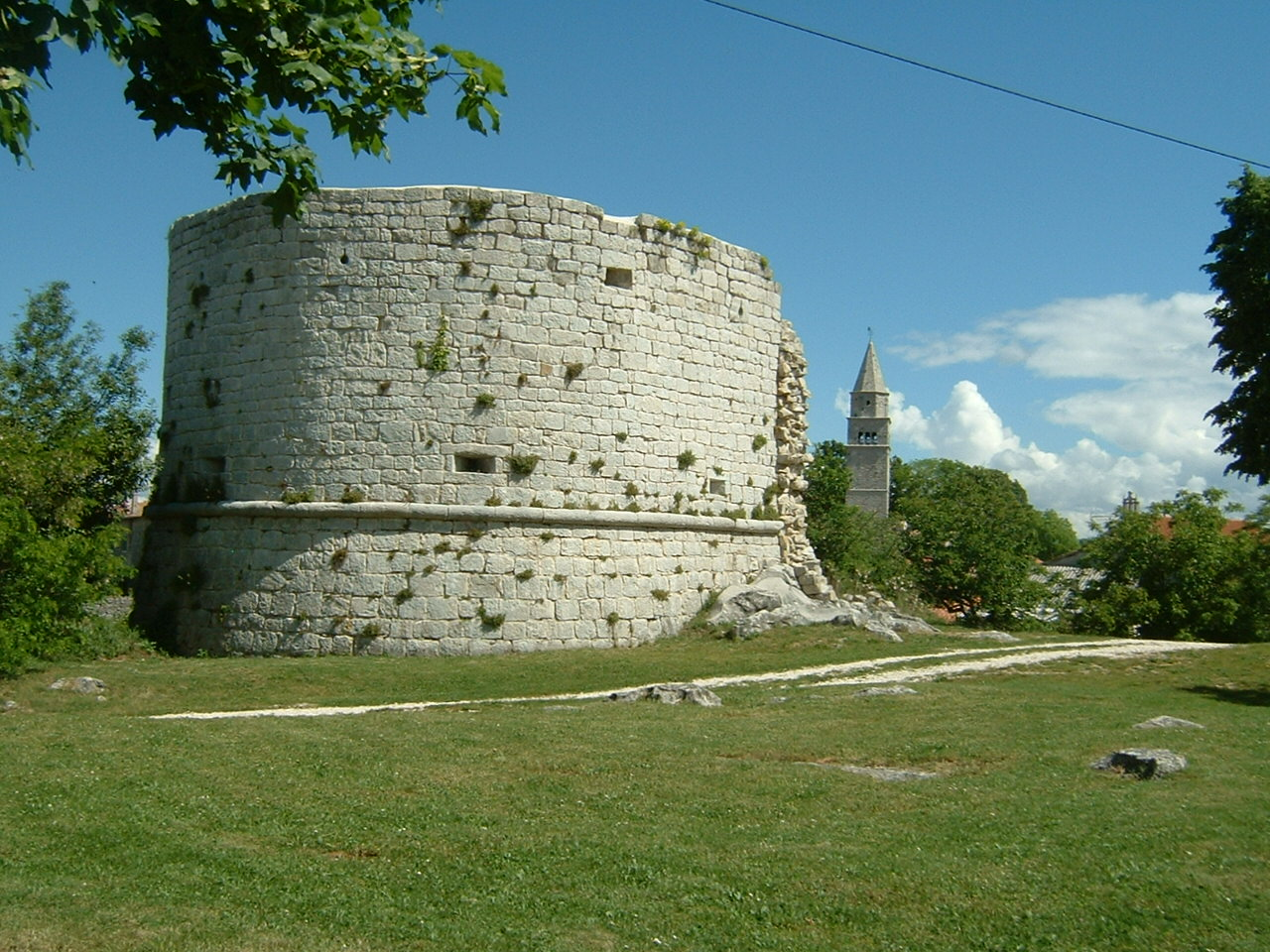
Defence tower

After the German king Otto I had conquered Italy in 952, he granted Istria with the vast March of Verona to his brother Duke Henry I of Bavaria. When his son and successor Emperor Otto II established the Duchy of Carinthia for Duke Henry the Younger in 976, he also gave him suzerainty over the southeastern Bavarian marches, including Verona, Istria, Carniola and Styria. In the 11th century, the newly established March of Istria fell under the jurisdiction of the Church of Aquileia and several German feudal families like the Counts of Andechs, who ruled as Dukes of Merania.

In 1199 Gračišće was first mentioned in written sources as Gallinianum. From that time onwards, the coastal areas of Istria were gradually conquered by the Republic of Venice, advantaged by the lack of a central authority upon the deposition of Emperor Frederick II in 1246 and the fall of the House of Hohenstaufen. Neverteheless the territories further inland around Pazin (German: Mitterburg) with Gračišće were retained by the Imperial Counts of Gorizia and in 1374 were inherited by the Austrian House of Habsburg. In 14th and 15th century Gračišće grew quite prosperous. The interior of Istria subsequently remained within the Holy Roman Empire until the empire's dissolution in 1806.

With the Napoleonic rule upon the 1805 Peace of Pressburg, Istria became part of the re-established Italian Kingdom and in 1809 was incorporated into the so-called Illyrian Provinces of the French Empire. After this short period the newly established Austrian Kingdom of Illyria comprised Istria, from 1849 as part of the Austrian Littoral. After World War I and the dissolution of Austria-Hungary, Istria was given to the Kingdom of Italy and after the end of World War II was relinquished to Yugoslavia. After the breakup of Yugoslavia in 1991, Istria (and Gračišće) became part of the Republic of Croatia, and administratively Gračišće became the seat of a municipality.

== Demographics ==
In 2021, the municipality had 1,312 residents in the following 7 settlements:

- Batlug-Batlugo, population 119
- Bazgalji-Basgali, population 230
- Gračišće-Gallignana, population 418
- Jakačići-Caligari, population 126
- Mandalenčići-Maddaleni, population 285
- Milotski Breg-Montemillotti, population 89
- Škopljak-Scopliaco, population 45
Gračišće: Population trends 1857–2021
v

population	1810	1872	2317	2357	2486	2645	2395	2277	2744	2625	2150	1815	1571	1456	1433	1419	1312
	1857	1869	1880	1890	1900	1910	1921	1931	1948	1953	1961	1971	1981	1991	2001	2011	2021

Sources: Croatian Bureau of Statistics publications

== Economy ==
The economy of Gračišće municipality is mostly based on agriculture (grapes, wheat, fruits) and raising livestock (cattle, pigs), a smaller part of its population is employed in service sector at Pazin. In recent times rural tourism is emerging.

== Architecture ==
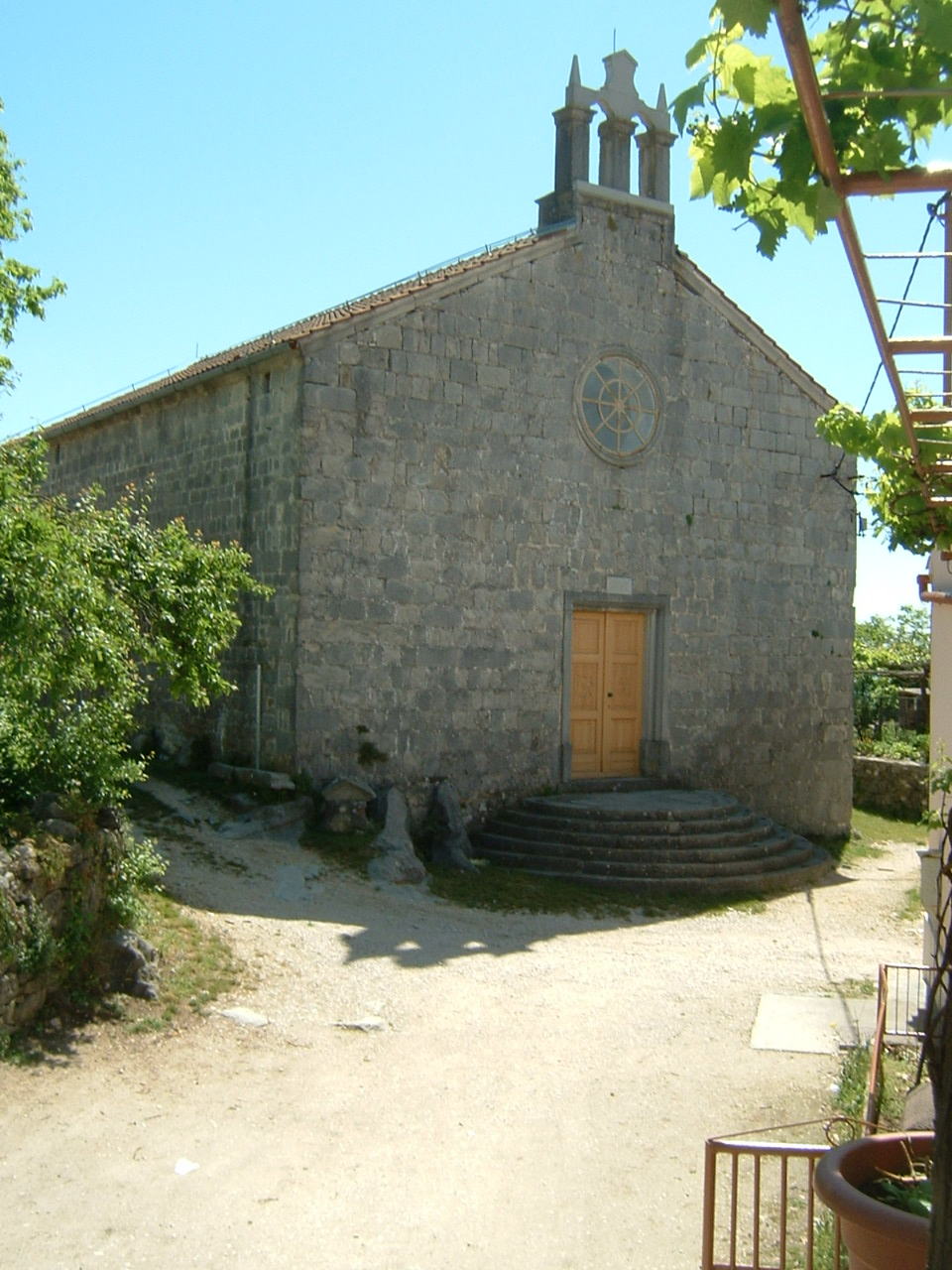
Church of St. Euphemia

Church of The Mother of God at the Square

Gračišće village has several interesting landmarks including the Church of The Mother of God at the Square (Croatian: Crkva majke božje na placu) built in 1425, the small Church of St. Anthony of Padova and The Church of St. Euphemia built in 1383. In St. Euphemia Church there is very impressive crucifix from the 13th century and golden Baroque altar. The successive reconstruction of St. Euphemia church did not change the essential characteristics of its medieval architecture. Many residential houses were built in the 15th century as dates which are inscribed on the portals show. In the Middle Ages it was encircled by fortifications and one of the towers and main municipal gates are still standing today.

The parish church of St. Vitus was built in 1769. The "Palace of Salamon" is the only example of a Gothic residence in this part of Istria. The summer residence of the Pićan bishop was also located in Gračišće.

The free-standing tower's lowest stage includes a Romanesque doorway, suggesting it may be one of the earliest buildings.

== Sources ==
- Gračaški zbornik (Gračišće's collection of scientific papers); Zbornik radova sa Znanstvenog skupa Gračišće i okolica od prapovijesti do danas, u povodu obilježavanja 800. obljetnice prvog spomena imena Gračišća, Gračišće, 19. lipnja 1999; Library: KNJIŽNICA ACTA; Publisher: Skupština udruga Matice hrvatske Istarske županije; Gračišće: Poglavarstvo općine, Pazin, 2002. ISBN 953-96663-7-6
- http://www.istra.hr/hr/dozivjeti_istru/povijest
