= Debenjak =

Debenjak is a Slovene surname. Notable people with the surname include:

- Božidar Debenjak (born 1935), Slovene Marxist philosopher, social theorist and translator
- Doris Debenjak (1936–2013), Slovene linguist and translator
- Florijan Debenjak (born 1969), Slovene footballer
