= Lihtenberk Castle =

Coordinates: 46°1′24.02″N 14°51′28.28″E

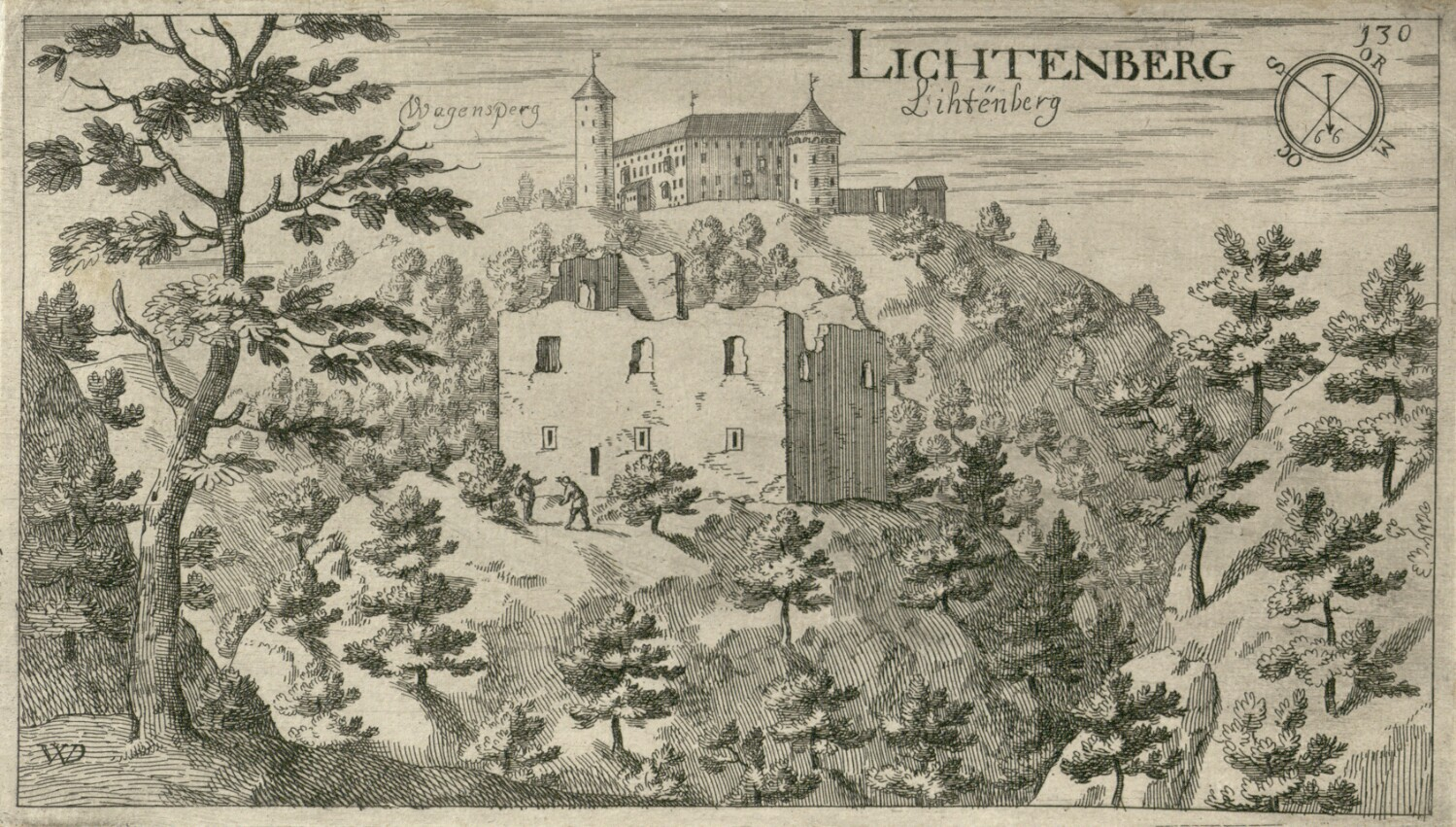
Lihtenberk Castle as depicted by Johann Weikhard von Valvasor in 1679

Lihtenberk Castle (Slovene: Grad Lihtenberk, German: Schloss Lichtenberg) is a 13th-century castle ruin located in the Municipality of Šmartno pri Litiji in central Slovenia, directly adjacent to later Bogenšperk Castle. It is best known for a minor association with the 17th-century historian Johann Weikhard von Valvasor, who owned the ruin and styled himself (among other things) "von Lichtenberg."

== Architecture ==
Lihtenberk was a walled castle with a three-story residential palacium, remnants of which are the only elements still visible today.

== History ==
The castle first appears in written sources in 1223, in a mention of its owner at the time, the Aquileian ministerialis Albert von Lichtenberg. The knights of Lichtenberg had taken the castle from the knights of Andechs, who had previously taken it from the knights of Weichselberg. In 1250, the castle was recorded as castrum Liechtemberch, in 1288 as castrum Leytemberch, in 1338 as Pilgrimum de Liechtenberch, and in 1393 and 1396 simply as Lyechtenberg. Around 1288 the castle was temporarily occupied by Count Meinhard of Tyrol, who gave it out in fief, but the Patriarchate of Aquileia soon intervened to revert the castle to its previous state of ownership.

At the end of the 15th century, the castle was received as dowry by Boltežar the noble Wagen, imperial administrator of the castles of Hošperk by Planina and Šteberk in Cerknica, as well as lord of Kostel Castle near the Kolpa River. By this time the castle was in a very poor state of repair, and the seat of the lordship was moved to newly built Bogenšperk Castle nearby. The fate of Lihtenberk was sealed by the 1511 Idrija earthquake, which badly damaged the building; in 1630 its owner Georg Kheysell demolished what was left and used the materials for the consolidation and repair of Bogenšperk, a practice continued later in the century by Valvasor.

== Sources ==
- Ivan Jakič, Vsi slovenski gradovi ("All Slovene Castles"), DZS, Ljubljana, 1997, p. 188
- Bogenšperk Castle - official website
