= Mandalenčići =

Mandalenčići Maddaleni
- Village
- Location within Croatia
- Coordinates: 45°11′54″N 13°58′53″E
- Country: Croatia
- County: Istria County
- Municipality: Gračišće

Area
  - Total: 4.6 sq mi (11.9 km^{2})

Population (2021)
  - Total: 285
  - Density: 62.0/sq mi (23.9/km^{2})
- Time zone: UTC+1 (CET)
  - Summer (DST): UTC+2 (CEST)
- Postal code: 52403 Gračišće
- Area code: 052

Mandalenčići (Italian: Maddaleni) is a village in the municipality of Gračišće in Istria, Croatia.

== Demographics ==
According to the 2021 census, its population was 285.

According to the 2001 Croatian census, the village had 255 inhabitants and 81 family households.
