= Batlug =

Batlug Batlugo
- Village
- Location within Croatia
- Coordinates: 45°09′41″N 13°58′24″E
- Country: Croatia
- County: Istria County
- Municipality: Gračišće

Area
  - Total: 4.5 sq mi (11.6 km^{2})

Population (2021)
  - Total: 119
  - Density: 26.6/sq mi (10.3/km^{2})
- Time zone: UTC+1 (CET)
  - Summer (DST): UTC+2 (CEST)
- Postal code: 52341 Žminj
- Area code: 052

Batlug (Italian: Batlugo) is a village in the municipality of Gračišće in Istria, Croatia.

== Demographics ==
According to the 2021 census, its population was 119.

According to the 2001 Croatian census, the village had 142 inhabitants and 42 family households.
