= Istrian olm =

Scientific classification
- Kingdom: Animalia
- Phylum: Chordata
- Class: Amphibia
- Order: Urodela
- Family: Proteidae
- Genus: Proteus
- Species: P. ikae

Binomial name
- Proteus ikae Jelić, Dufresnes and Jablonski, 2026

Species of amphibian

The Istrian olm (Proteus ikae) is a species of the olm consisting of several populations found in the deep karst aquifers of the Istrian peninsula. Its lineage was the first among the olm to diverge, beginning around 16 million years ago. It was first described as an individual species by Dušan Jelić, Christophe Dufresnes and Daniel Jablonski in 2026. The Istrian olm population "substantially differs" from others in the genus, featuring an "elongated, narrow snout, limited gills, short tail as well as weakly spaced but longer limbs".

It is known to populate a total of six localities in Istria, and has been provisionally described as endangered according to criteria of the IUCN.

== Etymology ==
Proteus ikae was named after Ika, a deity of springs and water whose worship by the Histri and the Liburni is evidenced by inscriptions from the village of Plomin and city of Pula.

== Habitats and conservation ==
The Istrian olm was historically found in six localities in Istria. According to Dušan Jelić, one of these localities is home to around 500 individuals, while the remaining five localities have "much smaller" populations. The Istrian olm's habitats are deep aquifer systems, limestone caves with "conspicuous yellow to reddish clay and mud deposits". One of these habitats, discovered in 2024, is the Nimfej water spring located near the Pula Arena. Others include the Baredine Cave, Raša, the Gradole spring, and Pincinova Cave.

As of 2026, the presence of the Istrian olm can no longer be confirmed in more than half of the historically researched localities. Jelić attributes this to factors such as pollution, salination due to rising sea levels, and the practice of filling in water wells. The water levels in the amphibian's habitats have also been dropping, most significantly due to increased freshwater demand from the public supply system, as well as tourism.

The olm is a Natura 2000 protected species in the European Union. Despite this, only three Istrian olm populations are being actively monitored, and on a volunteer basis, due to a lack of financial support from the government and local authorities. The monitoring project is primarily funded by international project funds and donations.
