= Bazgalji =

Bazgalji Basgali
- Village
- Location within Croatia
- Coordinates: 45°11′49″N 13°56′30″E
- Country: Croatia
- County: Istria County
- Municipality: Gračišće

Area
  - Total: 3.5 sq mi (9.1 km^{2})

Population (2021)
  - Total: 230
  - Density: 65/sq mi (25/km^{2})
- Time zone: UTC+1 (CET)
  - Summer (DST): UTC+2 (CEST)
- Postal code: 52000 Pazin
- Area code: 052

Bazgalji (Italian: Basgali) is a village in the municipality of Gračišće in Istria, Croatia.

== Demographics ==
According to the 2021 census, its population was 230.

According to the 2001 Croatian census, the village had 233 inhabitants. and 59 family households.
