= Bogenšperk Castle =

Castle in central Slovenia

Coordinates: 46°1′24.71″N 14°51′26.81″E

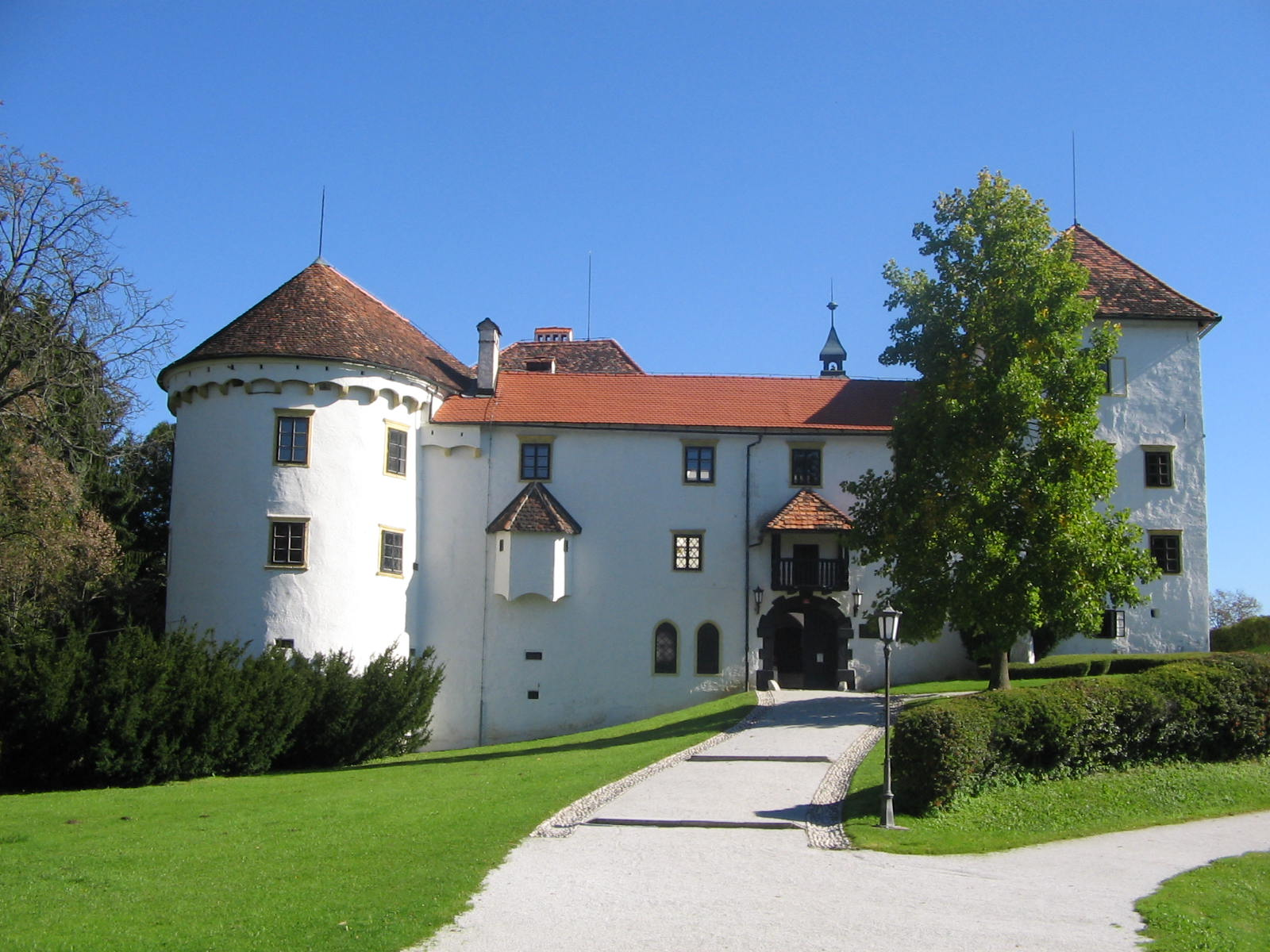
Bogenšperk Castle

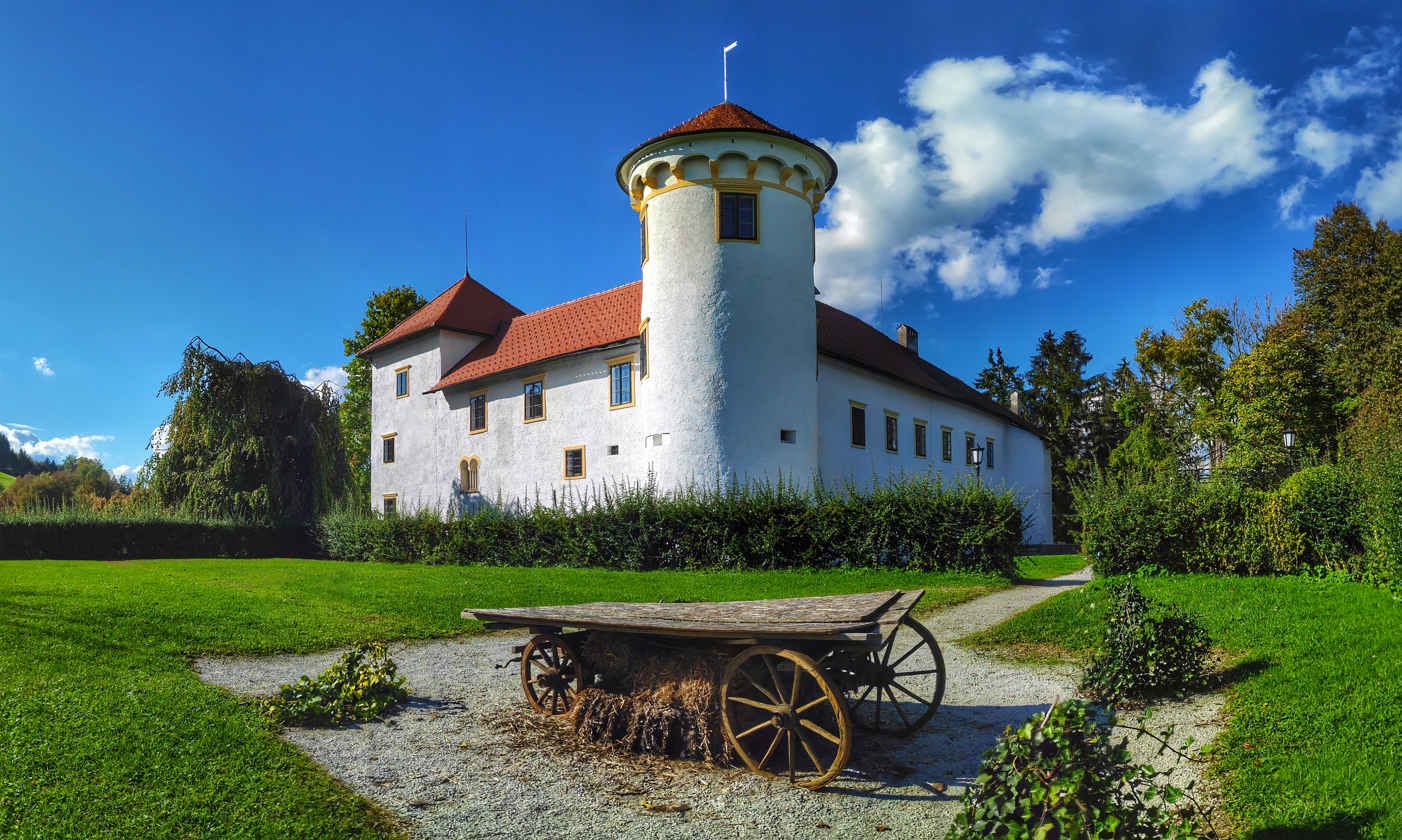
View from the east

Bogenšperk Castle (pronounced [ˈboːɡɛnʃpɛɾk]; Slovene: Grad Bogenšperk, German: Schloss Wagensperg) is a 16th-century castle located in the Municipality of Šmartno pri Litiji in central Slovenia. It is best known for its association with the 17th-century scientist and natural historian Johann Weikhard von Valvasor, a fellow of the Royal Society in London.

== Architecture ==
Standing on a low hill at an elevation of 412 m, the Renaissance castle is fully restored, and is listed as an important cultural monument of Slovenia. The three-story building consists of four tracts from several time periods, connecting four towers and surrounding an arcaded inner courtyard. The oldest part of the castle is the north tower, which originally stood as a standalone fortification. A wooden bridge was later added, linking it to the south-east tower, which originally served a defensive purpose and was once much higher than the rest of the building; however, since a 1759 fire caused by a lightning-strike heavily damaged the castle, the tower was never rebuilt to its original level. The castle stands on bedrock; one of its attractions is a deep well carved directly into the rock.

== History ==
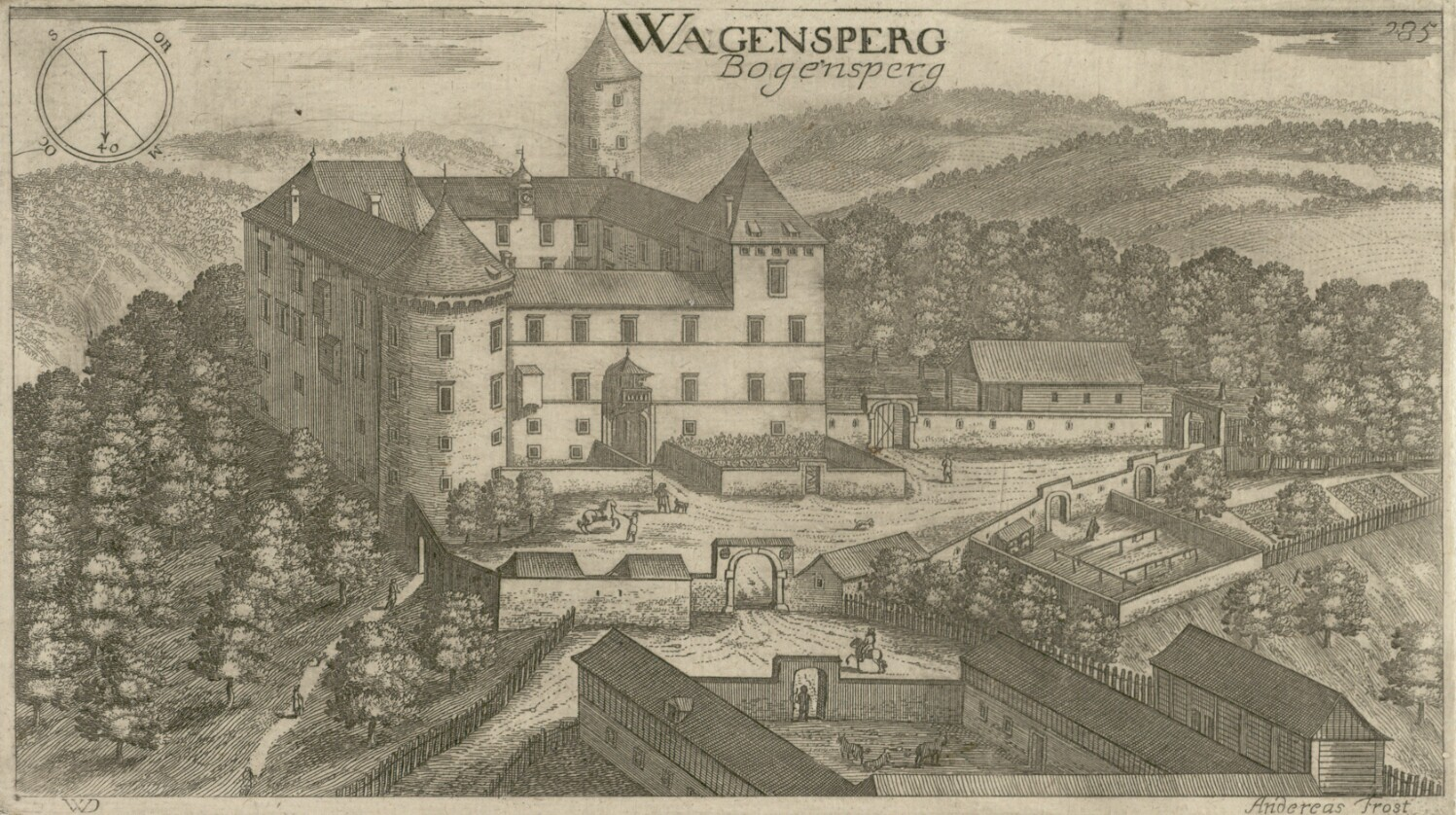
Bogenšperk Castle on a Valvasor's engraving from 1679

In its current form, the castle was likely begun by the noble house of Wagen as a replacement for Boltežar Wagen's nearby Lihtenberk Castle, already in disrepair and severely damaged by a major earthquake in 1511. After the 1630 death of Jurij Wagen, the last member of the family, the castle changed several owners until it was in 1672 finally bought by Johann Weikhard von Valvasor after his return from abroad. Thoroughly renovated, it was furnished with a graphic studio, a library, printing press and collection of curiosities. Due to the enormous cost of issuing Valvasor's book, The Glory of the Duchy of Carniola, Valvasor became heavily indebted, and was forced to sell first his valuable library and, in 1692, his estates. His family moved to Krško, while the castle again changed several owners, the last being the noble family Windischgrätz, who abandoned the castle in 1943. While its interior furnishings were destroyed or looted, the castle itself survived the war intact and was in its immediate aftermath turned into a military hospital. From 1957 it was occupied by Jesuits, who carried out some preventive maintenance on the structure; in 1972, a systematic reconstruction effort began, at first led by the art historian Milan Železnik.

== Museum ==
The renovated premises now function as a museum, with exhibits and collections including:

- Reconstructions of Valvasor's study and printing press
- Superstition and Witchcraft Collection
- Traditional Folk Costume Collection
- Blaž Zarnik Geological Collection, including a full geological survey of the municipality of Šmartno pri Litiji)
- Surveying and Mapping Collection
- Hunting Collection
- reconstructed chapel

The castle's first floor also contains a wedding hall and restaurant. The surrounding grounds are a park.

== Sources ==
- Bogenšperk Castle - official site
- gremoVEN.com - Bogenšperk
