= The Glory of the Duchy of Carniola =

1689 encyclopedia by Johann Weikhard von Valvasor

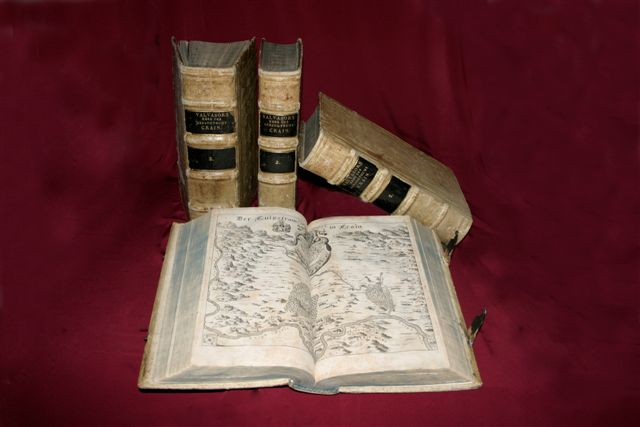
The Glory of the Duchy of Carniola, published 1689

The Glory of the Duchy of Carniola (German: Die Ehre deß Hertzogthums Crain, Slovene: Slava vojvodine Kranjske) is an encyclopedia published in Nuremberg in 1689 by the polymath Johann Weikhard von Valvasor. It is the most important work on his homeland, the Duchy of Carniola, the present-day central part of Slovenia.

== Content ==
Written in New High German, the anthology was published in four volumes, subdivided into 15 books with 3,552 large-format pages and 24 annexes. It was lavishly illustrated with 528 copperplate engravings. The work refers to history, geography, topography, medicine, biology, geology, theology, customs and folklore of the Carniolan region that makes up a large part of present-day Slovenia. Valvasor could rely on older accounts, nevertheless the meticulously researched and scientifically sound collection was pioneering at that time. From 2009 until 2012, it was translated into Slovene by Doris, Primož and Božidar Debenjak. The initiator, project manager, editor and technical editor of this publishing project was Tomaž Čeč.

Valvasor was the first to write about the olm. He intended to write a kind of travelogue rather than a dictionary and therefore the entries are not arranged in alphabetical order. The author also sprinkles anecdotes, fairytales and poems to diversify the composition. Concerned that outsiders did not know his region well enough, he undertook the presentation of Carniola in words and pictures, installing a copperplate workshop at his Bogenšperk Castle near Litija and publishing collections of his work.
