= Great Armorial =

1687–1688 book by J Valvasor and J Ramschissl

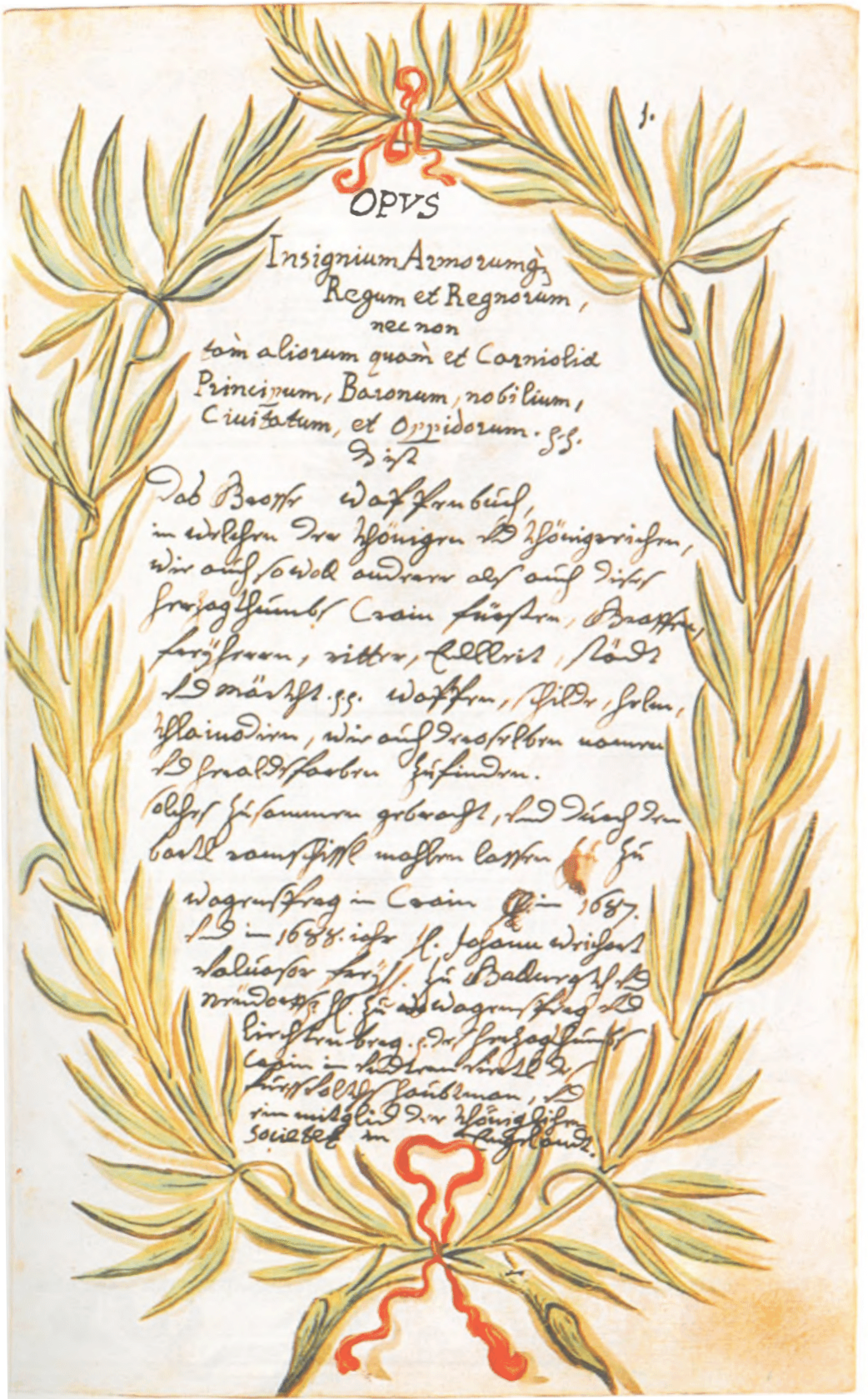
- Authors: Johann Weikhard von Valvasor; Jernej Ramschüssl
- Original title: Opus Insignium Armorumque
- Illustrators: Jernej Ramschüssl
- Language: German, Latin
- Genre: armorial book
- Publication date: 1688
- Publication place: Duchy of Carniola, Holy Roman Empire

The Great Armorial (Latin: Opus Insignium Armorumque, German: Das Grosse Wappenbuch, Slovene: Velika grbovna knjiga), also known as The Great Heraldry Book, is an extensive manuscript armorial book compiled between 1687 and 1688 by Johann Weikhard von Valvasor and Jernej Ramschissl. The entire German title is as follows:

Das Grosse Wappenbuch, in welchen der khönigen und khönigerichen, wie auch so woll anderer als auch dises herzogthumbs Crain fürsten, Graffen, freyherrn, ritter, Edlleut, städt und märkht p.p. Wappen, schilde, helm, khlainodien, wie auch deroselben namen und heraldsfarben zufinden.

The book contains 2041 coats of arms of noble families, cities, market towns and church institutions of the eastern alpine lands of Carniola, Styria and Carinthia and represents the historically most important work of heraldry created in the Slovene Lands and a central source for modern heraldry. The book constitutes a huge heraldic corpus of the nobility, ecclesiastical institutions, and bourgeois settlements of the three historical lands of the Eastern Alps and, to a lesser extent, even the German region.

The manuscript is the work of Johann Weikhard von Valvasor, who collected the coats of arms and provided them with inscriptions, and Jernej Ramschissl, who drew and colored the collected coats of arms. The entire project took place between 1687 and 1688 at Bogenšperk Castle.

Due to the polymath's financial difficulties and the sale of his movable property, in 1691, after mediation by Valvasor's colleague Pavao Ritter Vitezović, the library, which included the Great Armorial, was purchased by the Bishop of Zagreb, Aleksander Ignac Mikulić. It is currently kept by the Metropolitan Library of the Archdiocese of Zagreb under the signature MR 160.

In 2020, a limited number of copies of the Slovenian translation of the armorial book were published by Založba Dežela Kranjska.

== Sources ==
- Reisp, Branko (1983). Kranjski polihistor Janez Vajkard Valvasor. Ljubljana: Mladinska knjiga.
- Weiss, Janez (2020). "Velika Grbovna Knjiga Janeza Vajkarda Valvasorja Komentar". academia.edu (in Slovenian).
- Valvasor, Janez Vajkard (2020). Velika grbovna knjiga (in Slovenian). Ljubljana: Založba dežela Kranjska.
- Cvet, David M. (February 2005). "Opus Insignium Armorumque 1687 - 1688 Das Grosse Wappenbuch". slovenija.heraldry.ca.
