= Milotski Breg =

Milotski Breg Montemillotti
- Village
- Location within Croatia
- Coordinates: 45°10′19″N 13°57′31″E
- Country: Croatia
- County: Istria County
- Municipality: Gračišće

Area
  - Total: 1.3 sq mi (3.3 km^{2})

Population (2021)
  - Total: 89
  - Density: 70/sq mi (27/km^{2})
- Time zone: UTC+1 (CET)
  - Summer (DST): UTC+2 (CEST)
- Postal code: 52341 Žminj
- Area code: 052

Milotski Breg (Italian: Montemillotti) is a village in the municipality of Gračišće in Istria, Croatia.

== Demographics ==
According to the 2021 census, its population was 89.

According to the 2001 Croatian census, the village had 89 inhabitants and 35 family households.
