= Jakačići =

Jakačići Caligari
- Village
- Location within Croatia
- Coordinates: 45°10′47″N 14°00′18″E
- Country: Croatia
- County: Istria County
- Municipality: Gračišće

Area
  - Total: 2.0 sq mi (5.3 km^{2})

Population (2021)
  - Total: 126
  - Density: 62/sq mi (24/km^{2})
- Time zone: UTC+1 (CET)
  - Summer (DST): UTC+2 (CEST)
- Postal code: 52332 Pićan
- Area code: 052

Jakačići (Italian: Caligari) is a village in the municipality of Gračišće in Istria, Croatia.

== Demographics ==
According to the 2021 census, its population was 126.

According to the 2001 Croatian census, the village had 152 inhabitants and 42 family households.
