= Božidar Debenjak =

Slovenian Marxist philosopher

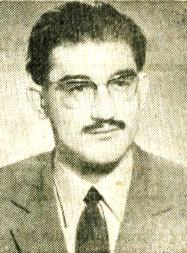
Božidar Debenjak

Božidar Debenjak (born 7 May 1935) is a Slovenian Marxist philosopher, social theorist and translator.

== Biography ==
He was born in Ljubljana, Slovenia, then part of the Kingdom of Yugoslavia. In 1961, he became professor at the University of Ljubljana. For more than thirty years, he taught Marxist theory and history of philosophy at the Ljubljana University; many renowned Slovenian philosophers and sociologists were among his pupils, including Slavoj Žižek, Mladen Dolar, Rastko Močnik, Renata Salecl and Tonči Kuzmanić. He was one of the first scholars to introduce the thought of the Frankfurt school in the curricula of Yugoslav universities.

He has written several books, mostly on Marxist theory, including a monograph on the thought of Friedrich Engels (Friedrich Engels: History and Alienation, 1970), in which he portrayed Engels as a "subtler historical materialist than Marx", who "managed to establish a clearer dividing line between history and nature". His Introduction to Marxist Philosophy (1977) was published in 4 editions, and was one of the most influential synthesis of Marxist thought in Slovenia.

He also translated several works, mostly from German, including several works by Karl Marx (especially young Marx), Friedrich Engels, Rosa Luxemburg, Theodor Adorno, Max Horkheimer, Herbert Marcuse, Karl Korsch, Lenin, Jürgen Habermas and Martin Luther. He also translated Hegel's Phenomenology of the Mind and Valvasor's The Glory of the Duchy of Carniola (together with his wife and son), and co-authored one of the most comprehensive Slovene-German dictionaries.

He was married to Doris Debenjak (née Krisch), a Slovenian translator of Gottschee German descent and chair of the Society of Native Gottschee Settlers.

== Major works ==
- Pota razvoja ("Paths of Development". Ljubljana, 1961).
- Friedrich Engels - zgodovina in odtujitev ("Friedrich Engels: History and Alienation". Maribor, 1970).
- V alternativi : marksistične študije ("In Alternative: Marxist Studies". Ljubljana, 1974).
- Meščanski kozmos in revolucionarna teorija: aspekti "kritične teorije družbe" ("The Bourgeois Universe and the Revolutionary Theory: Aspects of the 'Critical Theory of Society'. Ljubljana, 1977).
- Vstop v marksistično filozofijo ("Introduction to Marxist Philosophy". Ljubljana, 1977).

== See also ==
- Praxis school
- Titoism
