= List of fellows of the Royal Society elected in 1687 =

This is a list of fellows of the Royal Society elected in 1687.

== Fellows ==
- Jacobus Sylvius (1647–1689)
- Johann Weikhard Valvasor Freiherr von (1641–1693)
- Benjamin Middleton (1668–1712)
- Jean de Hautefeuille (1647–1724)
- William Wotton (1666–1727)
