= Doris Debenjak =

Slovenian linguist and translator

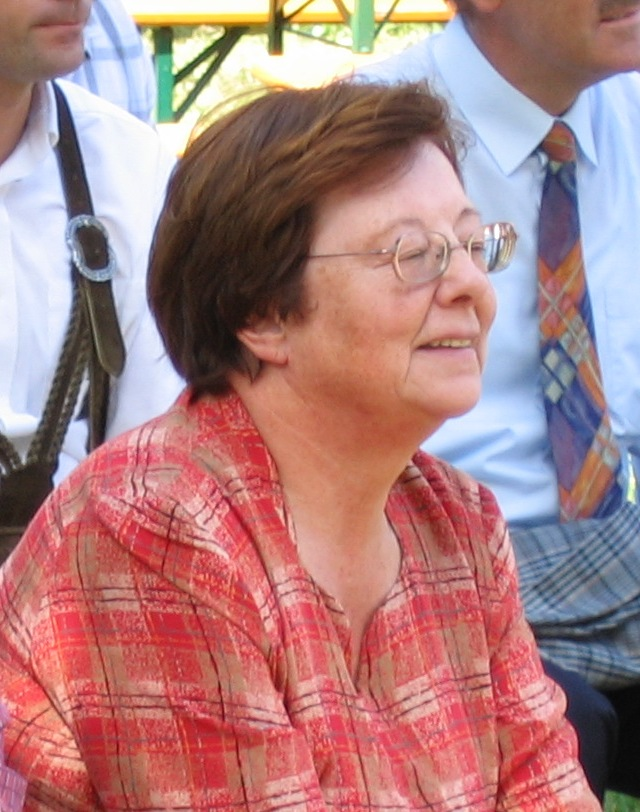
- Born: 5 August 1936; Ljubljana
- Died: September 21, 2013 (aged 77); Ljubljana

Academic background
- Education: University of Ljubljana

Doris Debenjak (née Krisch) (5 August 1936 – 21 September 2013) was a Slovene and Gottschee German linguist and translator.

== Life and work ==
Doris Krisch was born in Ljubljana to Gottschee German parents. She grew up speaking both German and Slovene. She was married to the Slovene philosopher and translator Božidar Debenjak.

She received her bachelor's degree in German and English in 1959 at the University of Ljubljana's Faculty of Arts. She then studied education for a year in Novo Mesto. She started working as an assistant instructor of German at the Department of German Language and Literature at the University of Ljubljana's Faculty of Arts in 1960. She started working independently as a translator into and from Slovene and German in 1982. From 1988 to 1991 she was the chair of the Union of Scientific and Technical Translators of Yugoslavia. In this capacity, she served as a deputy in the Assembly of the Socialist Republic of Slovenia, being named in the committee investigating circumstances surrounding the arrest and trial of Janez Janša, Ivan Borštner, David Tasić and Franci Zavrl. She was the chief author of the largest Slovene–German and German–Slovene dictionaries, which she published together with her husband and her son Primož. She was also a major translator of the five-volume Slovene translation of Johann Weikhard von Valvasor's The Glory of the Duchy of Carniola.

Doris Debenjak was a member of the Society of Native Gottschee Settlers (Slovene: Društvo Kočevarjev staroselcev, German: Gottscheer Altsiedler Verein), which was founded in 1992 in Kočevske Poljane. She was elected a member of the society's governing board on 8 December 2002.

== Major works ==
- Doris Debenjak. 1974. Nemško-slovenski in slovensko-nemški slovar. Ljubljana: Cankarjeva založba.
- Doris Debenjak, Božidar Debenjak, & Primož Debenjak, 1993. Veliki nemško-slovenski slovar. Ljubljana: DZS.
- Doris Debenjak, Božidar Debenjak, & Primož Debenjak. 1995. Veliki slovensko-nemški slovar. Ljubljana: DZS.
- Doris Debenjak, Božidar Debenjak, & Primož Debenjak. 2004. Mali nemško-slovenski & slovensko-nemški slovar. Ljubljana: DZS.
- Johann Weikhard von Valvasor. 2009–2013. Čast in slava vojvodine Kranjske. Transl. Doris Debenjak, Božidar Debenjak, Primož Debenjak, et al. Ljubljana: Zavod Dežela Kranjska.
