= Johann Weikhard von Valvasor =

Carnolian scientist

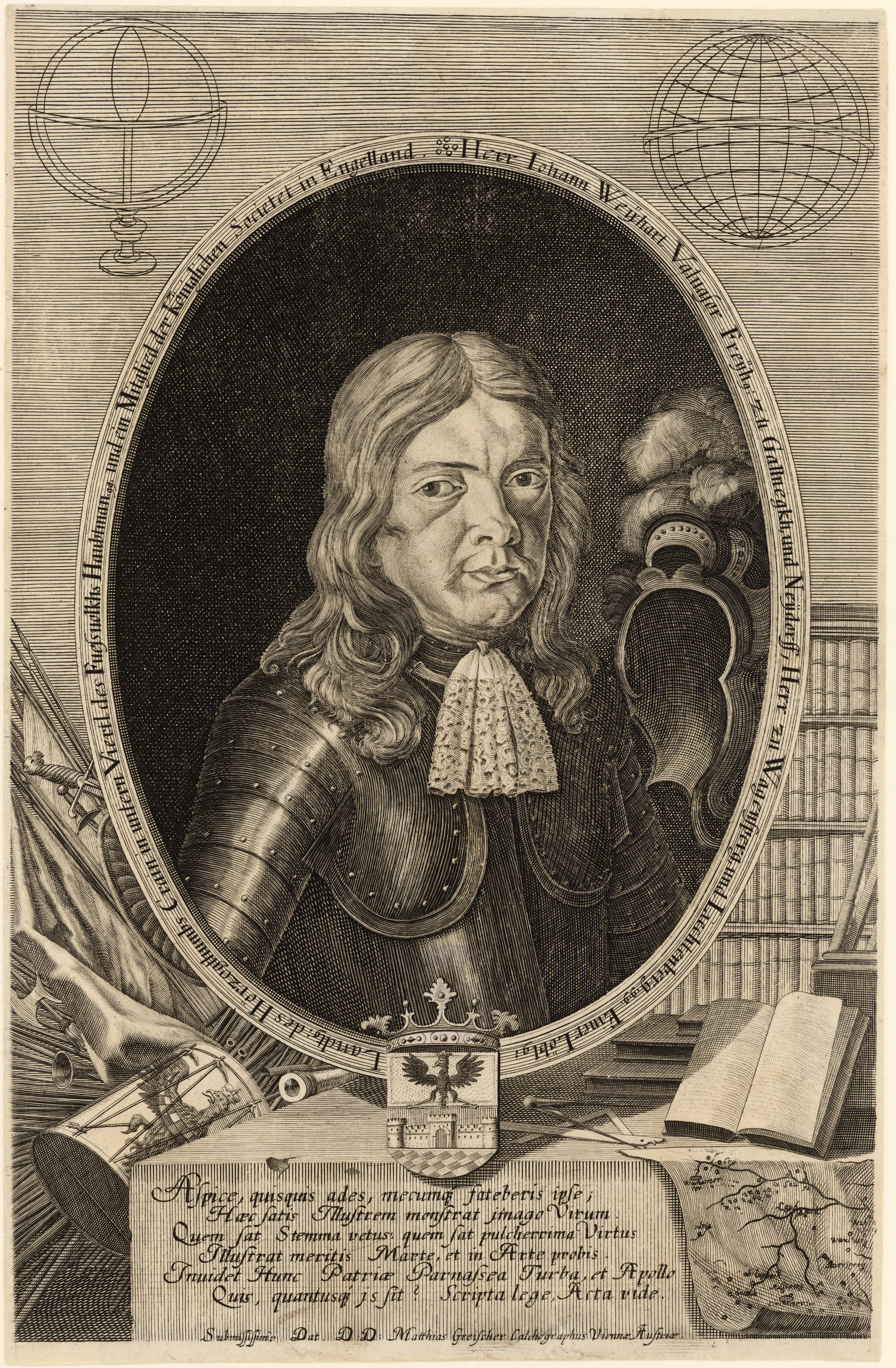
- Valvasor in 1689
- Born: 1641; Laibach, Carniola, Austria (now Ljubljana, Slovenia)
- Died: September or October 1693 (aged 52); Gurkfeld, Carniola, Austria (now Krško, Slovenia)
- Known for: nobleman, scholar, polymath
- Title: Member of the Royal Society
- Spouse: Anna Rosina Valvasor née Grafenweger
- Parent(s): Bartholomäus von Valvasor; Anna Maria von Valvasor née Rauber

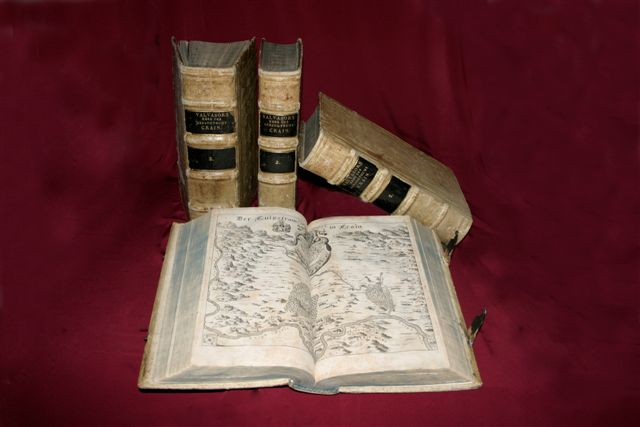
Valvasor's The Glory of the Duchy of Carniola, published 1689

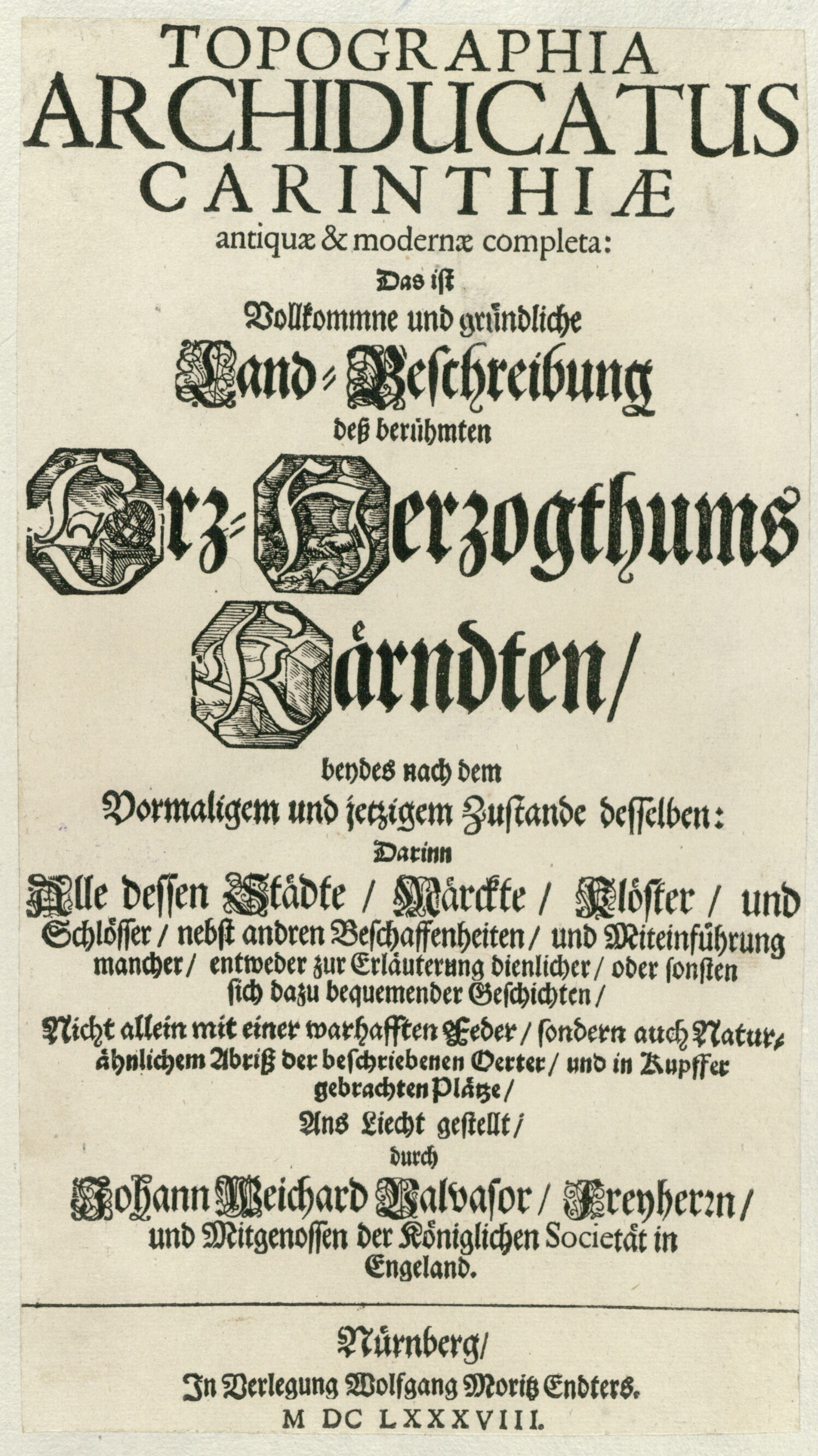
Title page of his Topographia Archiducatus Carinthiae antiquae et modernae completa, 1688

Valvasor's map of Carniola in Die Ehre deß Hertzogthums Crain

Johann Weikhard Freiherr von Valvasor (Note: The word "Freiherr" denotes a baron. Valvasor never officially held the title, but was referred to as such by the people who admired him and gradually adopted it also himself in his writings.) or Johann Weichard Freiherr von Valvasor (Note: Although the spelling Weichard is used in Die Ehre... and Topographia..., the spelling Weikhard is more common in printed sources today.) (Slovenized: Janez Vajkard Valvasor, pronounced [ˈʋáːlʋazɔɾ]) or simply Valvasor (baptised on 28 May 1641 – September or October 1693) was a natural historian and polymath from Carniola, present-day Slovenia, and a fellow of the Royal Society in London.

He is known as a pioneer in the study of karst topography. Together with his other writings, until the late 19th century his best-known work—the 1689 Glory of the Duchy of Carniola, published in 15 books in four volumes—was the main source for older Slovenian history, making him one of the precursors of modern Slovenian historiography.

== Biography ==
Valvasor was born in the town of Ljubljana (Laibach), at the time the principal city of Duchy of Carniola, today the capital of Slovenia, to an aristocratic family originally from Bergamo, Italy. In the 16th century, it was Johann Baptist Valvasor who moved the Valvasor family to the Duchy of Carniola in central Europe, to a part of the Habsburg monarchy that is now part of Slovenia. In medieval Latin Valvasor or Valvasore held the meaning 'carrier of a feud'.

Neither the exact day nor the actual place of Valvasor's birth are known, but his baptism was registered at Ljubljana Cathedral, where he was baptized Joannes Waichardus Valvasor. He was the twelfth child born to Bartholomäus and Anna Maria Freiin von Rauber, who only lived at Medija Castle in Izlake but also had a town residence in Ljubljana at Old Square. His godparents were Freiherr (Baron) Konrad Ruess von Ruessenstein from Strmol Castle and Regina Dorothea Rasp from Krumperk Castle.

Valvasor's father died when the boy was ten years old. His mother died when he was 16. At the time he was attending the Jesuit school in Ljubljana. Graduating in 1659 at the age of seventeen, he did not choose to continue his studies at a university but decided to broaden his horizons by meeting learned men on a journey across Europe. This journey lasted fourteen years and it even took him to northern Africa. During this period, he joined the army in the Austro-Turkish War, where he became closely acquainted with the conditions on the Croatian Military Frontier.

Shortly after marrying 13-year-old Anna Rosina Grafenweger in 1672, Valvasor acquired Bogenšperk Castle near Litija, where he arranged a writing, drawing and printing workshop. Valvasor spent a fortune on the publishing of his books; towards the end of his life, his debts forced him to sell Bogenšperk Castle, his vast library and his collection of prints. In 1690, Aleksandar Ignacije Mikulić, the Bishop of Zagreb, bought his library, along with some 7,300 graphics, and moved it to Slavonia, where the collection became part of the library of the Zagreb Archbishopric, now part of the Croatian State Archives. In 1692, he lost most of his wealth after he invested in travel, graphics and printbooks which proved unprofitable. He had nine children, among them daughters Maria Sidonia, Maximilla Kordula, Johanna Rosina, and Anna Theresia, and sons Wolfang Waikhard, Johann Gottlieb, Johann Ludwig, Johann Wolfgang Engelbert, and Franz Joseph. Five children died very early, and then, when delivering their last child in 1687, Anna Maria Rosina died as well. Just three months after her death, Valvasor married Baroness Anna Maximilla Zetschker of Vrhovo. They had four children. In 1693, the same year that their last child, Franz Engelbert, was baptized, Valvasor died at age 52 in Krško.

He is believed to have been buried in the family crypt at Medija Castle, but this is uncertain. The Yugoslav Partisans dynamited the castle in 1944 and no trace of his putative grave remains today.

== Legacy ==
=== The Glory of the Duchy of Carniola ===
Valvasor's most important work remains The Glory of the Duchy of Carniola (original title: Die Ehre deß Herzogthums Crain, Slovene: Slava vojvodine Kranjske), published in 1689 in 15 books (four volumes), totalling 3,532 pages and including 528 illustrations and 24 appendices, which provides a vivid description of Carniola at the time. He also recorded the first written document on vampires when he wrote on the legend of a vampire in Istria named Jure Grando.

From 2009 until 2012, it was translated into Slovene by Doris, Primož and Božidar Debenjak. The initiator, project manager, editor and technical editor of this monumental publishing project was Tomaž Čeč.

=== Karst research ===
Valvasor was a pioneer of study of karst phenomena. At the proposal of Edmond Halley, who was not only an astronomer but also a geophysicist, in 1687 his extensive treatise on the hydrology of intermittent Lake Cerknica won him a fellowship of the Royal Society.

== Works ==
- Dominicae passionis icones, 1679, reprint 1970 COBISS 261635
- Topographia Ducatus Carnioliae modernae das ist Controfee aller Stätt, Märckht, Clöster und Schlösser, wie sie anietzo stehen in dem Herzogthumb Crain, 1679, reprint 1970 COBISS 19019831
- Topographia arcium Lambergianarum id est arces, castella et dominia in Carniolia habita possident comites a Lamberg; Bagenspergi (Bogenšperg), 1679 COBISS 75121664, reprint 1995 COBISS 50098688
- Topographia Archiducatus Carinthiae modernae: das ist Controfee aller Stätt, Märckht, Clöster, undt Schlösser, wie sie anietzo stehen in dem Ertzhertzogthumb Khärnten; Wagensperg in Crain (Bogenšperg), 1681 COBISS 87695872; Nürnberg, 1688 COBISS 87695872
- Carniolia, Karstia, Histria et Windorum Marchia, Labaci (Ljubljana) 1681 COBISS 217886464
- Theatrum mortis humanae tripartitum: figuris aeneis illustratum: das ist: Schau-Bühne des menschlichen Todts in drey Theil: mit schönen Kupffer-Stichen geziehrt vnd an Tag gegeben; Laybach, Saltzburg (Ljubljana, Salzburg); 1682 COBISS 53622528
- Topographia Archiducatus Carinthiae antiquae & modernae completa: Das ist Vollkommene und gründliche Land – Beschreibung des berühmten Erz – Herzogthums Kärndten; Nürnberg 1688, COBISS 87695872
- Opus insignium armorumque ...; (1687–1688) COBISS 33650176
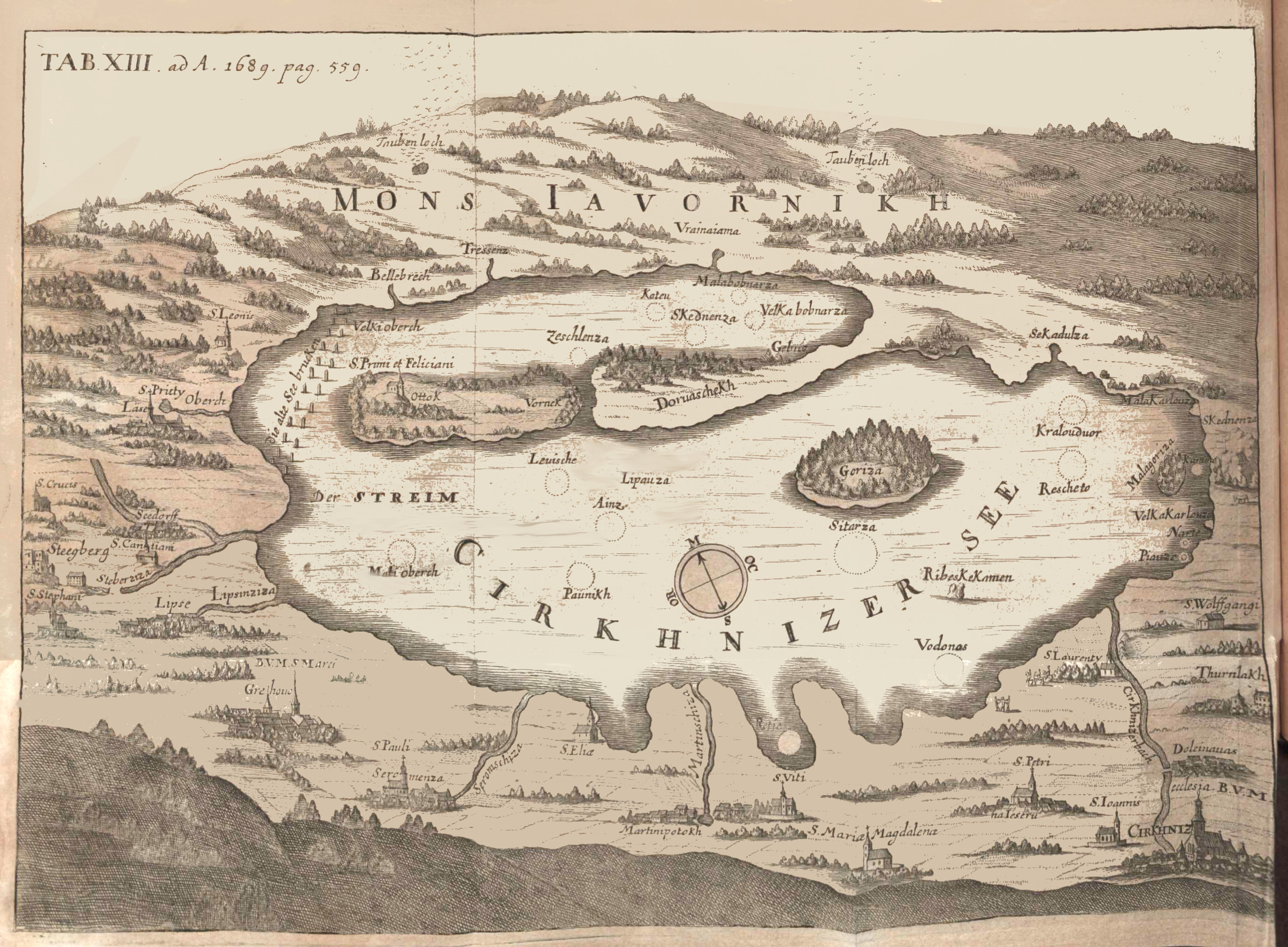
- Lake Cerknica, from a critique of the first volume of Die Ehre deß Hertzogthums Crain published in Acta Eruditorum, 1689
  Die Ehre deß Hertzogthums Crain: das ist, Wahre, gründliche, und recht eigendliche Belegen- und Beschaffenheit dieses Römisch-Keyserlichen herrlichen Erblandes; Laybach (Ljubljana) 1689 COBISS 29952257
