= Viktor II of Ratibor =

Victor II
- Duke of Ratibor, Prince of Corvey, Prince of Hohenlohe-Schillingsfürst
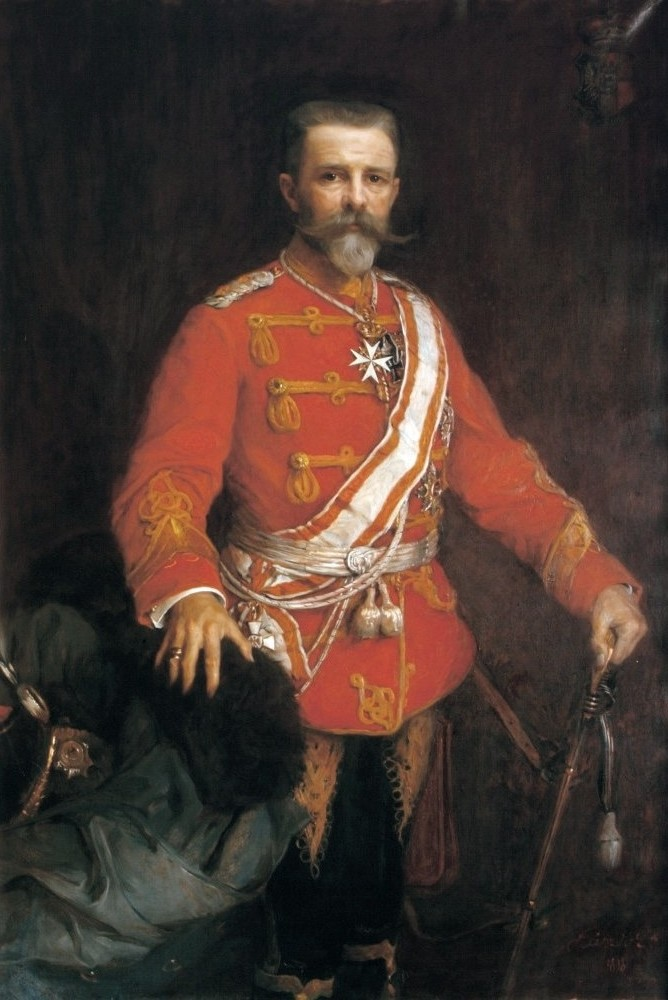
- Victor II painting by Philip de László, 1898
- Born: 6 September 1847; Rudy Palace, Kingdom of Prussia
- Died: 9 August 1923 (aged 75); Corvey Abbey, Weimar Republic
- Spouse: Countess Marie Breuner-Enckevoirt (m. 1877)
- Issue: Victor III, Duke of Ratibor; Prince Hans; Agatha, Princess Friedrich Wilhelm of Prussia; Princess Margaret
Names
- German: Viktor Amadeus
- House: Hohenlohe-Schillingsfürst
- Father: Victor I, Duke of Ratibor
- Mother: Princess Amelie of Fürstenberg

Victor II, Duke of Ratibor, Prince of Corvey, Prince of Hohenlohe-Schillingsfürst (German: Viktor Amadeus 2. Herzog von Ratibor, 2. Fürst von Corvey, Prinz zu Hohenlohe-Schillingsfürst; 6 September 1847 – 9 August 1923) was a member of the House of Hohenlohe-Schillingsfürst and Duke of the Silesian duchy of Ratibor (Polish: Racibórz). He was a lawyer, an cavalry officer in the Royal Prussian Army and a politician in the Free Conservative Party. He served in the Prussian House of Lords, and as the chairman of the provincial parliaments of Silesia and Upper Silesia between 1897 and 1921.

== Early life and family ==
Victor was born at Rauden Castle, Kingdom of Prussia, eldest son of Victor I, Duke of Ratibor (1818–1893), (son of Franz Joseph, Prince of Hohenlohe-Schillingsfürst and Princess Constanze of Hohenlohe-Langenburg) and his wife, Princess Amelie of Fürstenberg (1821–1899), (daughter of Charles Egon II, Prince of Fürstenberg and Princess Amalie of Baden).

He studied law in Bonn and Göttingen and was a member of the Corps Borussia (1867) and Corps Saxonia (1890). In Saxonia were also his four brothers, Max, Karl Egon, Franz (Colonel à la suite) and Egon (Lord Chamberlain).

== Military career ==
After making his Doctorate in Law, he entered the Potsdamer Life Guards Hussar Regiment in which he fought during the Franco-Prussian War.

== Political career ==
Between 1873 and 1876, he worked at the German Embassy in Vienna. In 1893, he took over the dominions Kieferstädtel and Zembowitz in Upper Silesia.

From 1897 to 1921, he served as the chairman of the provincial parliaments of Silesia during the German Empire (to 1918) and Upper Silesia during the Weimar Republic (1919–1921). As a member of the Free Conservative Party, he ran in 1885 and 1888 for the Prussian House of Representatives. Since 1893, he was a member of the Prussian House of Lords. From 1896 to 1904, he was chairman of the New Coalition Party.

== Marriage ==
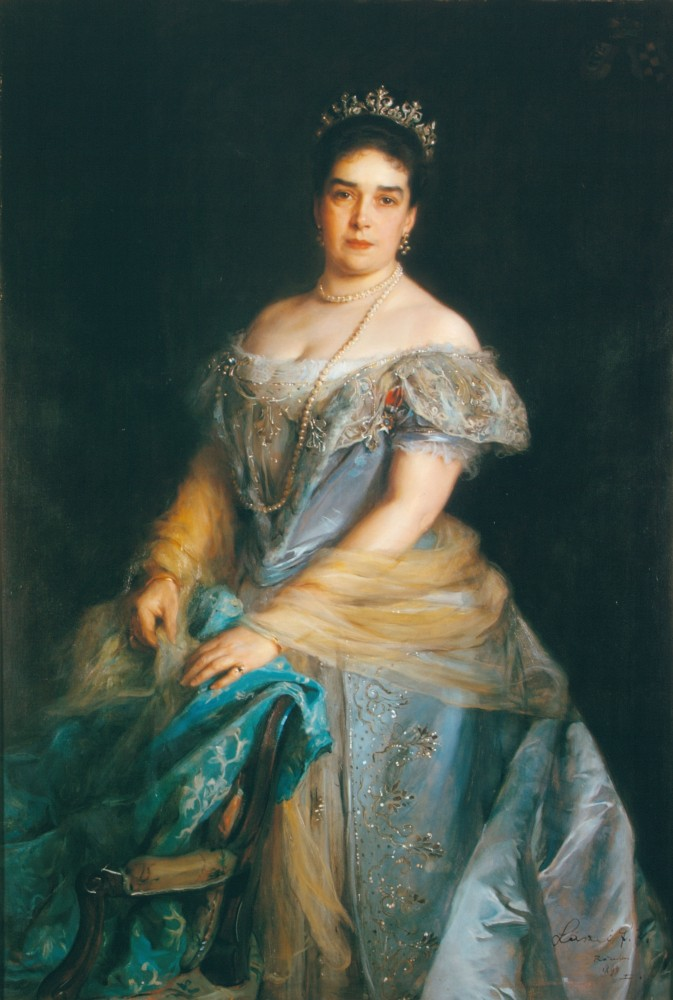
Portrait of Countess Marie Breuner-Enckevoirt by Philip de László, 1899

Victor married 19 June 1877 at Vienna to Countess Marie Breuner-Enckevoirt (1856–1929), daughter of Count August Johann Breuner-Enckevoirt, and his wife, Countess Agota Széchényi de Sárvár-Felsövidék.

They had four children:

- Victor III, Duke of Ratibor (Rauden, 2 February 1879 – Corvey, 11 November 1945), married in 1910 to Princess Elisabeth of Oettingen-Spielberg (1886–1976), had issue.
- Prince Hans of Hohenlohe-Schillingsfürst (Rauden, 8 March 1882 – Walkersdorf Castle, 5 January 1948), married in 1918 to Princess Marie of Windisch-Graetz (1898–1992), no issue.
- Princess Agathe of Hohenlohe-Schillingsfürst (Rauden, 24 July 1888 – Wiesbaden, 12 December 1960), married in 1910 to Prince Friedrich Wilhelm of Prussia (1880–1925), had issue.
- Princess Margarete of Hohenlohe-Schillingsfürst (Rauden, 3 Mar 1894 – Corvey, 23 May 1973), never married.

== Honours, awards and arms ==
=== Military appointments ===
- Major general à la suite of the Prussian Army

=== Honorary citizenships and doctorates ===
- Honorary Citizen of Breslau, 1913

=== Orders and decorations ===
- Kingdom of Prussia:
  - Iron Cross (1870), 2nd Class on Black Band
  - Knight of the Royal Crown Order, 1st Class, 8 February 1893
  - Knight of the Black Eagle, with Collar
  - Grand Commander's Cross of the Royal House Order of Hohenzollern
  - Red Cross Medal, 3rd Class
- Hohenzollern: Cross of Honour of the Princely House Order of Hohenzollern, 1st Class
- Baden:
  - Knight of the Zähringer Lion, 1st Class with Swords and Oak Leaves, 1872
  - Knight of the House Order of Fidelity, 1893
  - Knight of the Order of Berthold the First, 1893
- (Saxe-Coburg and Gotha) (Duchy of Saxe-Altenburg) (Saxe-Meiningen) Ernestine duchies: Grand Cross of the Saxe-Ernestine House Order
- Saxe-Weimar-Eisenach: Grand Cross of the White Falcon
- Kingdom of Saxony: Grand Cross of the Albert Order, with Star in Gold, 1898
- Schaumburg-Lippe: Military Merit Medal
- Austria-Hungary: Commander of the Order of Franz Joseph, 1876
- Sovereign Military Order of Malta: Bailiff Grand Cross of Honour and Devotion
- Persian Empire: Order of the Lion and the Sun, 1st Class
- Sweden-Norway: Commander Grand Cross of the North Star, 7 September 1893

=== Arms ===
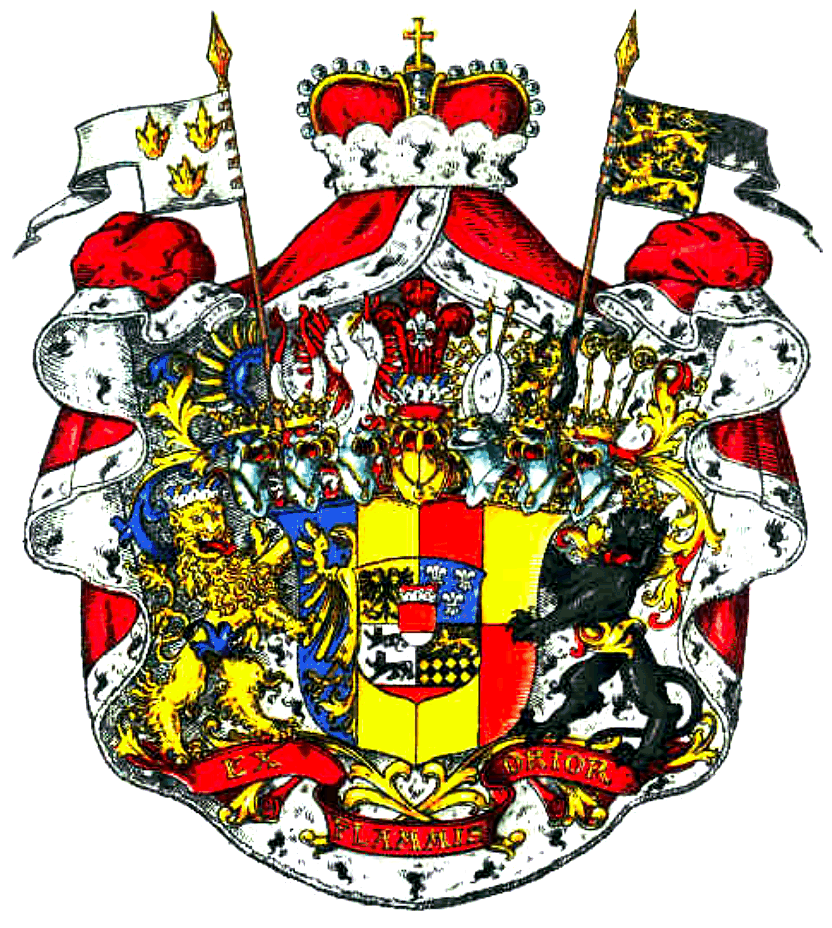
Arms of the Duke of Ratibor and Prince of Corvey

== Ancestry ==
Ancestors of Viktor II of Ratibor

8. Karl Albrecht II, 3rd Prince of Hohenlohe-Waldenburg-Schillingsfürst
4. Franz Joseph, 1st Prince of Hohenlohe-Schillingsfürst
9. Baroness Judith Reviczky of Revisnye
2. Viktor I, 1st Duke of Ratibor, 1st Prince of Corvey, Prince of Hohenlohe-Schillingsfürst
10. Karl Ludwig, 3rd Prince of Hohenlohe-Langenburg
5. Princess Constanze of Hohenlohe-Langenburg
11. Countess Amalie Henriette of Solms-Baruth
1. Viktor II, 2nd Duke of Ratibor, 2nd Prince of Corvey, Prince of Hohenlohe-Schillingsfürst
12. Karl Aloys, Prince of Fürstenberg
6. Karl Egon II, Prince of Fürstenberg
13. Princess Elisabeth of Thurn and Taxis
3. Princess Amelie of Fürstenberg
14. Charles Frederick, Grand Duke of Baden
7. Amalie of Baden
15. Louise Caroline of Hochberg

== Notes and sources ==
- Genealogisches Handbuch des Adels, Fürstliche Häuser, Reference: 1956

Viktor II, 2nd Duke of Ratibor, 2nd Prince of Corvey House of Hohenlohe-Schillingsfürst Cadet branch of the House of Hohenlohe Born: 6 September 1847 Died: 9 August 1923
German nobility
Preceded by Victor I	Duke of Ratibor; 30 January 1893 – 11 August 1919	Succeeded by German nobility titles abolished
Preceded by Victor I	Prince of Corvey; 30 January 1893 – 11 August 1919	Succeeded by German nobility titles abolished
Titles in pretence
Loss of title	— TITULAR — Duke of Ratibor; 11 August 1919 – 9 August 1923; Reason for succession failure: German nobility titles abolished	Succeeded by Victor III
Loss of title	— TITULAR — Prince of Corvey; 11 August 1919 – 9 August 1923; Reason for succession failure: German nobility titles abolished	Succeeded by Victor III
