= Princess Amelie of Fürstenberg =

German princess

Amélie
- Duchess of Ratibor, Princess of Corvey, Princess of Hohenlohe-Schillingsfürst
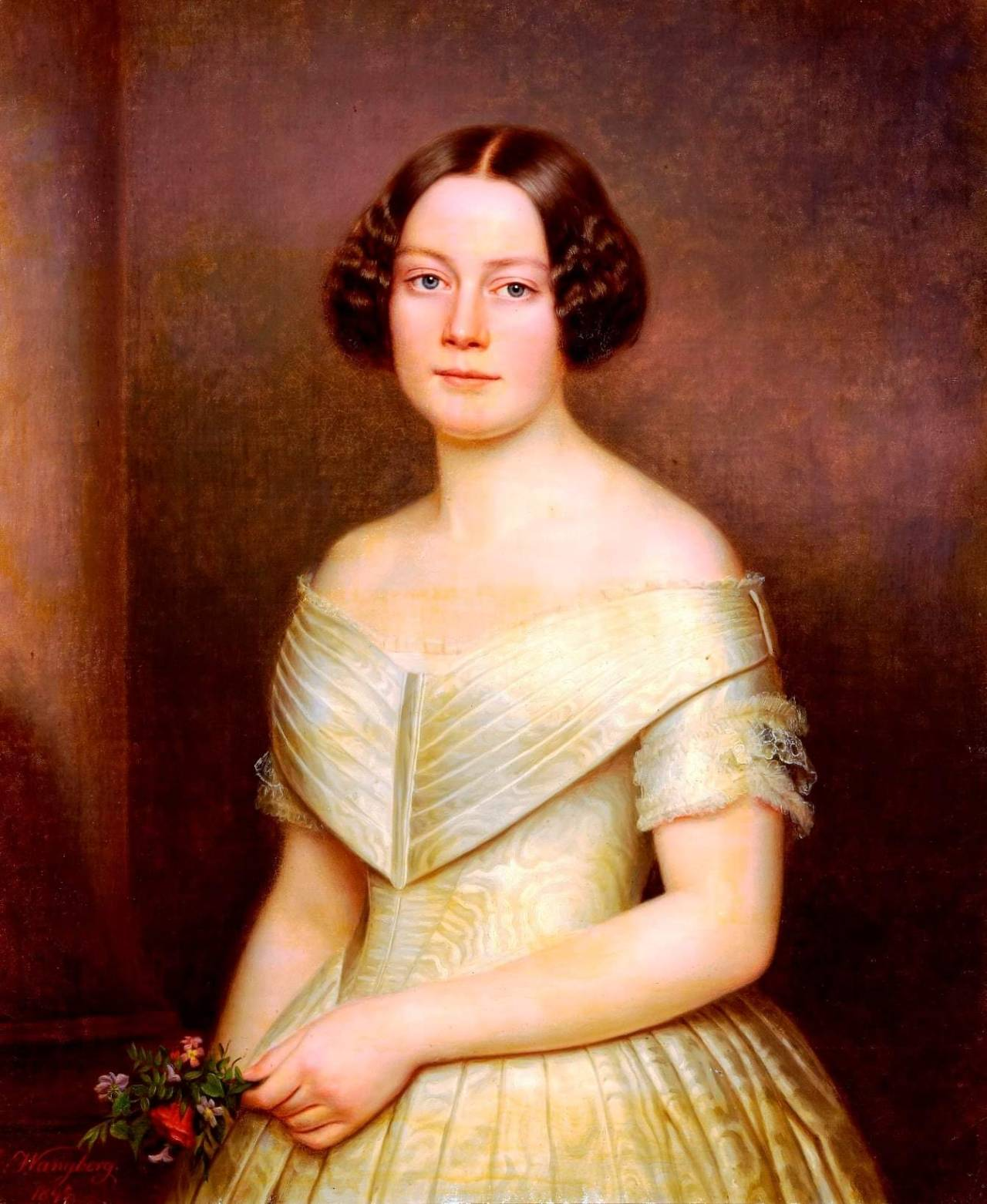
- Portrait of Princess Amalie, by Richard Lauchert, 1840s
- Born: 12 February 1821; Donaueschingen, Grand Duchy of Baden, German Empire
- Died: 17 January 1899 (aged 77); Rauden Palace, Rudy, Upper Silesia, Kingdom of Prussia
- Spouse: Victor I, Duke of Ratibor (m. 1845; died 1893)
- Issue: Princess Amelia; Viktor II, Duke of Ratibor; Prince Franz; Princess Elisabeth; Prince Egon; Princess Marie; Prince Maximilian; Prince Ernst; Prince Karl Egon; Princess Margaret
- House: Fürstenberg
- Father: Charles Egon II, Prince of Fürstenberg
- Mother: Amalie of Baden

Marie Amélie, Duchess of Ratibor, Princess of Corvey, Princess of Hohenlohe-Schillingsfürst (née Princess Amélie of Fürstenberg; 12 February 1821 – 17 January 1899), was the consort of Victor I, Duke of Ratibor.

== Early life ==
Princess Amelie of Fürstenberg was born at her family's Princely Palace in Donaueschingen, in the Grand Duchy of Baden, German Empire, on 29 March 1822. She was the daughter of Charles Egon II, Prince of Fürstenberg and Princess Amalie of Baden. Among his siblings were Princess Marie Elisabeth, Charles Egon III, Prince of Fürstenberg, Prince Maximilian Egon I, Prince Emil Egon, and Princess Pauline Wilhelmine (who married Hugo, Prince of Hohenlohe-Oehringen).

Her father was the only son of the Austrian General Karl Aloys zu Fürstenberg (a grandson of Joseph Wilhelm Ernst, Prince of Fürstenberg) and Princess Elisabeth von Thurn und Taxis (a daughter of Alexander Ferdinand, 3rd Prince of Thurn and Taxis). Her maternal grandparents were Charles Frederick, Grand Duke of Baden, and his second wife, Louise Caroline of Hochberg. As her grandparents' marriage was morganatic, her mother was born without princely status and excluded from the dynastic line of the House of Zähringen. She was accorded her mother's baronial status until 1796, when her mother was made Countess of Hochberg, at which time she assumed comital rank.

== Personal life ==
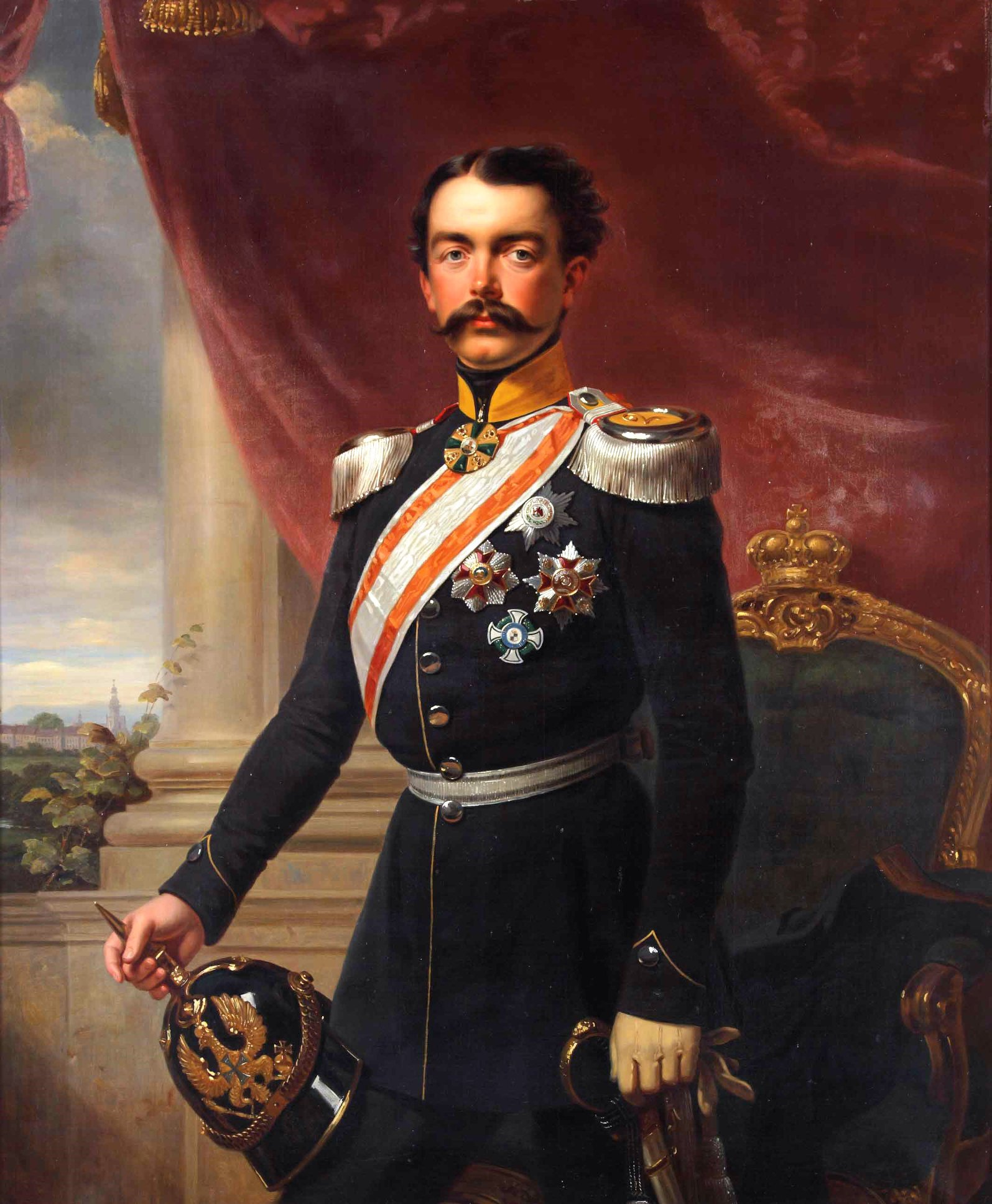
Portrait of her husband, by Richard Lauchert, 1845

On 19 April 1845 at Donaueschingen, Princess Amelie married Victor I, Duke of Ratibor, the eldest son of Franz Joseph, Prince of Hohenlohe-Schillingsfürst and Princess Constanze of Hohenlohe-Langenburg. They had ten children:

- Princess Amelia of Hohenlohe-Schillingsfürst (1846–1847), who died young.
- Viktor II, Duke of Ratibor (1847–1923), who married Countess Maria Breunner-Enkevoirth, in 1867.
- Prince Franz of Hohenlohe-Schillingsfürst (1849–1925)
- Princess Elisabeth of Hohenlohe-Schillingsfürst (1851–1928)
- Prince Egon of Hohenlohe-Schillingsfürst (1853–1896), who married Princess Leopoldine of Lobkowicz, in 1885.
- Princess Marie of Hohenlohe-Schillingsfürst (1854–1928)
- Prince Maximilian of Hohenlohe-Schillingsfürst (1856–1924), who married Countess Franziska Grimaud d'Orsay, in 1882.
- Prince Ernst of Hohenlohe-Schillingsfürst (1857–1891)
- Prince Karl Egon of Hohenlohe-Schillingsfürst (1860–1931)
- Princess Margaret of Hohenlohe-Schillingsfürst (1863–1940)

She died on 17 January 1899 at Rauden Palace.

== Ancestry ==
Ancestors of Princess Amelie of Fürstenberg

8. Charles Egon I, Prince of Fürstenberg
4. Charles Aloys, Prince of Fürstenberg
9. Countess Maria Josepha von Sternberg
2. Charles Egon II, Prince of Fürstenberg
10. Alexander Ferdinand, 3rd Prince of Thurn and Taxis
5. Princess Elisabeth of Thurn and Taxis
11. Princess Maria Henriette Josepha of Fürstenberg
1. Princess Amelie of Fürstenberg
12. Frederick, Hereditary Prince of Baden-Durlach
6. Charles Frederick, Grand Duke of Baden
13. Princess Amalia of Nassau-Dietz
3. Princess Amalie of Baden
14. Baron Ludwig Heinrich Geyer von Geyersberg
7. Baroness Caroline Louise Geyer von Geyersberg
15. Countess Maximiliana Christiane von Sponeck
