= Prince Maximilian Egon I of Fürstenberg =

German politician (1822–1873)

Prince Maximilian Egon I
- Born: 29 March 1822; Donaueschingen, Grand Duchy of Baden, German Empire
- Died: 27 July 1873 (aged 51); Bohemia, Austria-Hungary
- Spouse: Countess Leontine von Khevenhüller-Metsch (m. 1860; died 1873)
- Issue: Maximilian Egon II, Prince of Fürstenberg; Prince Karl Emil of Fürstenberg
Names
- Maximilian Egon I von Fürstenberg
- House: Fürstenberg
- Father: Charles Egon II, Prince of Fürstenberg
- Mother: Princess Amalie of Baden

Prince Maximilian Egon I of Fürstenberg (29 March 1822 – 27 July 1873), was a German politician.

== Early life ==
He was born at his family's Princely Palace in Donaueschingen, in the Grand Duchy of Baden, German Empire, on 29 March 1822. He was the second son of Charles Egon II, Prince of Fürstenberg and Princess Amalie of Baden. Among his siblings were Princess Marie Elisabeth, Charles Egon III, Prince of Fürstenberg, Princess Maria Amalia (who married Viktor I of Hohenlohe-Schillingsfürst, Duke of Ratibor), Prince Emil Egon, and Princess Pauline Wilhelmine (who married Hugo, Prince of Hohenlohe-Oehringen).

His father was the only son of the Austrian General Karl Aloys zu Fürstenberg (a grandson of Joseph Wilhelm Ernst, Prince of Fürstenberg) and Princess Elisabeth von Thurn und Taxis (a daughter of Alexander Ferdinand, 3rd Prince of Thurn and Taxis). His maternal grandparents were Charles Frederick, Grand Duke of Baden, and his second wife, Louise Caroline of Hochberg. As his grandparents' marriage was morganatic, his mother was born without princely status and excluded from the dynastic line of the House of Zähringen. She was accorded her mother's baronial status until 1796, when her mother was made Countess of Hochberg, at which time she assumed comital rank.

== Career ==
He inherited a number of manorial rights and possessions, the Secundogeniture in Pürglitz, and became a member of the Austrian House of Lords. The Fürstenbergs owned the town until 1929, when it was sold to the Czech Republic.

== Personal life ==
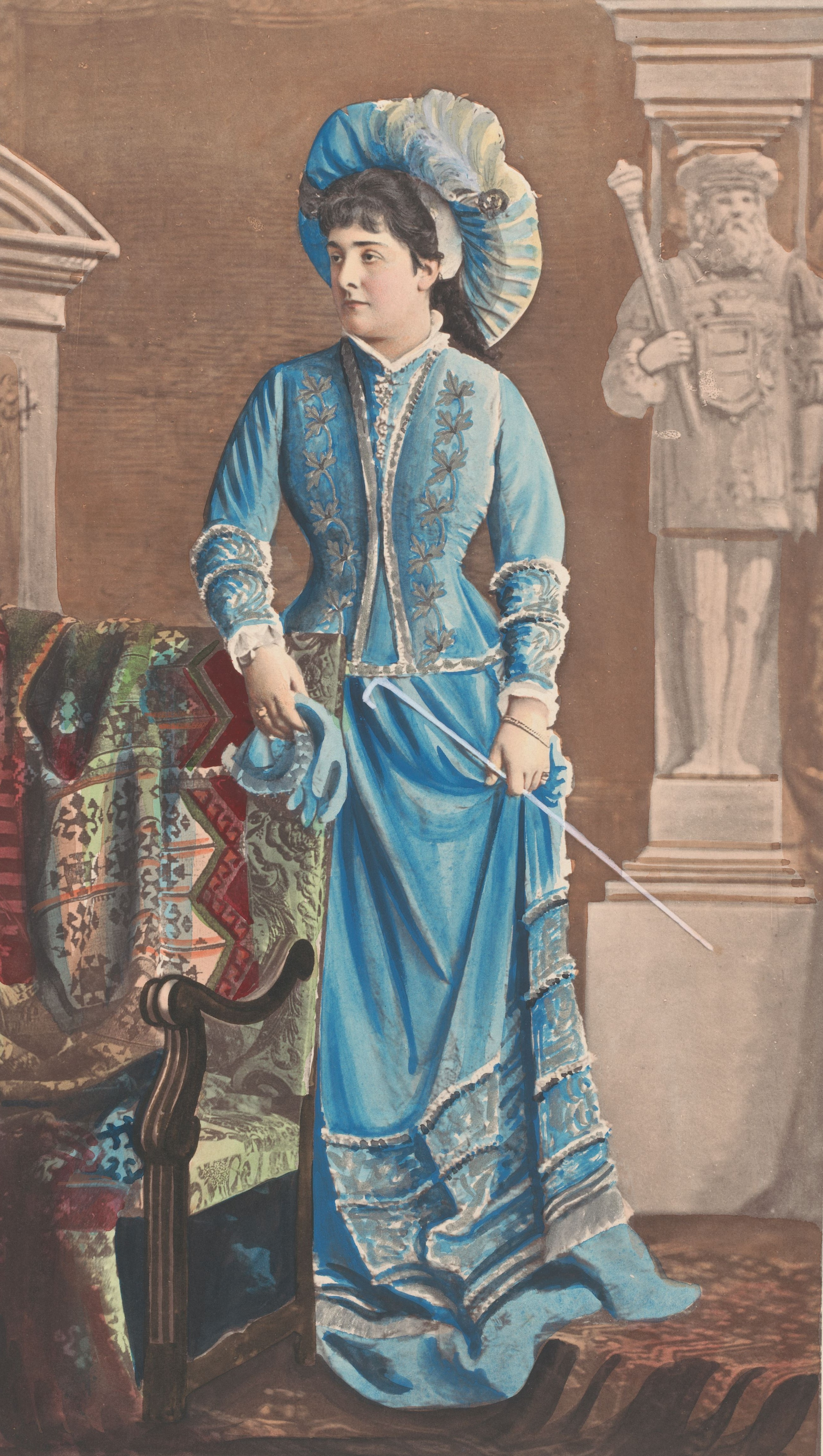
Portrait of his wife, Countess Leontine von Khevenhüller-Metsch, c. 1880

In 1860, Prince Maximilian was married to Countess Leontine Antonie Marie von Khevenhüller-Metsch (1843–1914), a daughter of Richard, 5th Prince of Khevenhüller-Metsch and Countess Antonia Maria Lichnowsky (a daughter of Prince Eduárd Lichnowsky). Before his death, they were the parents of:

- Maximilian Egon II, Prince of Fürstenberg (1863–1941), who married Countess Irma von Schönborn-Buchheim, a daughter of Erwein, 4th Count of Schönborn-Buchheim, and Countess Franziska von Trauttmansdorff-Weinsberg, in 1889.
- Prince Karl Emil of Fürstenberg (1867–1945), who married Maria Festetics de Tolna, a daughter of Prince Tasziló Festetics de Tolna and Lady Mary Douglas-Hamilton (the former wife of Albert I, Prince of Monaco, Lady Mary was the only daughter of William Hamilton, 11th Duke of Hamilton and Princess Marie Amelie of Baden).

Prince Maximilian died in Bohemia on 27 July 1873. After his death, his widow married his younger brother, Prince Emil Egon, in 1875. In 1896, his eldest son, Maximilian Egon II, became the Head of the House of Fürstenberg, inheriting territorial titles in Prussia, Austria, Hungary, Württemberg and Baden, and by virtue of them had a seat in the House of Lords in each of the five states. Until the First World War, he was vice-president of the Prussian House of Lords.

=== Descendants ===
Through his eldest son Max Egon II, he was a grandfather of Karl Egon V, Princess Leontina of Fürstenberg (who married Hugo, 4th Prince of Windisch-Graetz), Princess Anna of Fürstenberg (who married Franz, 8th Prince of Khevenhüller-Metsch), Prince Maximilian Egon of Fürstenberg (who married Countess Wilhelmine von Schönburg-Glauchau), and Prince Friedrich Eduard of Fürstenberg (who was killed in action during World War I).

Through his younger son Prince Karl Emil, he was a grandfather of Prince Tassilo of Fürstenberg (who married Clara Agnelli and was the father of Princess Ira von Fürstenberg, Prince Egon von Fürstenberg); Princess Antonie of Fürstenberg (who married Prince Karel VI Schwarzenberg), and Prince Georg of Fürstenberg (who married Christina von Colloredo-Mannsfeld).

== Ancestry ==
Ancestors of Prince Maximilian Egon I of Fürstenberg

8. Charles Egon I, Prince of Fürstenberg
4. Charles Aloys, Prince of Fürstenberg
9. Countess Maria Josepha von Sternberg
2. Charles Egon II, Prince of Fürstenberg
10. Alexander Ferdinand, 3rd Prince of Thurn and Taxis
5. Princess Elisabeth of Thurn and Taxis
11. Princess Maria Henriette Josepha of Fürstenberg
1. Prince Maximilian Egon I of Fürstenberg
12. Frederick, Hereditary Prince of Baden-Durlach
6. Charles Frederick, Grand Duke of Baden
13. Princess Amalia of Nassau-Dietz
3. Princess Amalie of Baden
14. Baron Ludwig Heinrich Geyer von Geyersberg
7. Baroness Caroline Louise Geyer von Geyersberg
15. Countess Maximiliana Christiane von Sponeck

== Bibliography ==
- Kurt von Priesdorff: Soldatisches Führertum. Band 8, Hanseatische Verlagsanstalt Hamburg, ohne Jahr, S. 151.
- C. F. Gutmann: Carl Egon III Fürst zu Fürstenberg. in: Schriften des Vereins für Geschichte und Naturgeschichte der Baar und der angrenzenden Landesteile in Donaueschingen. VIII. Heft 1893, Tübingen 1893. S. 1–44. online (PDF; 22,9 MB)
