= Charles Egon =

Charles Egon may refer to:

- Charles Egon II, Prince of Fürstenberg (1796–1854)
- Charles Egon III, Prince of Fürstenberg (1820–1892)
- Charles Egon IV, Prince of Fürstenberg (1852–1896)
