= Maximilian I =

Maximilian I may refer to:

- Maximilian I, Holy Roman Emperor, reigned 1486/93–1519
- Maximilian I, Elector of Bavaria, reigned 1597–1651
- Maximilian I, Prince of Hohenzollern-Sigmaringen (1636–1689)
- Maximilian I Joseph of Bavaria, reigned 1795–1805 (Elector of Bavaria) and 1806–1825 (King of Bavaria)
- Maximilian I of Mexico, reigned 1864–1867
- Prince Maximilian Egon I of Fürstenberg
