= August, Prince of Hohenlohe-Öhringen =

August
- Prince of Hohenlohe-Öhringen
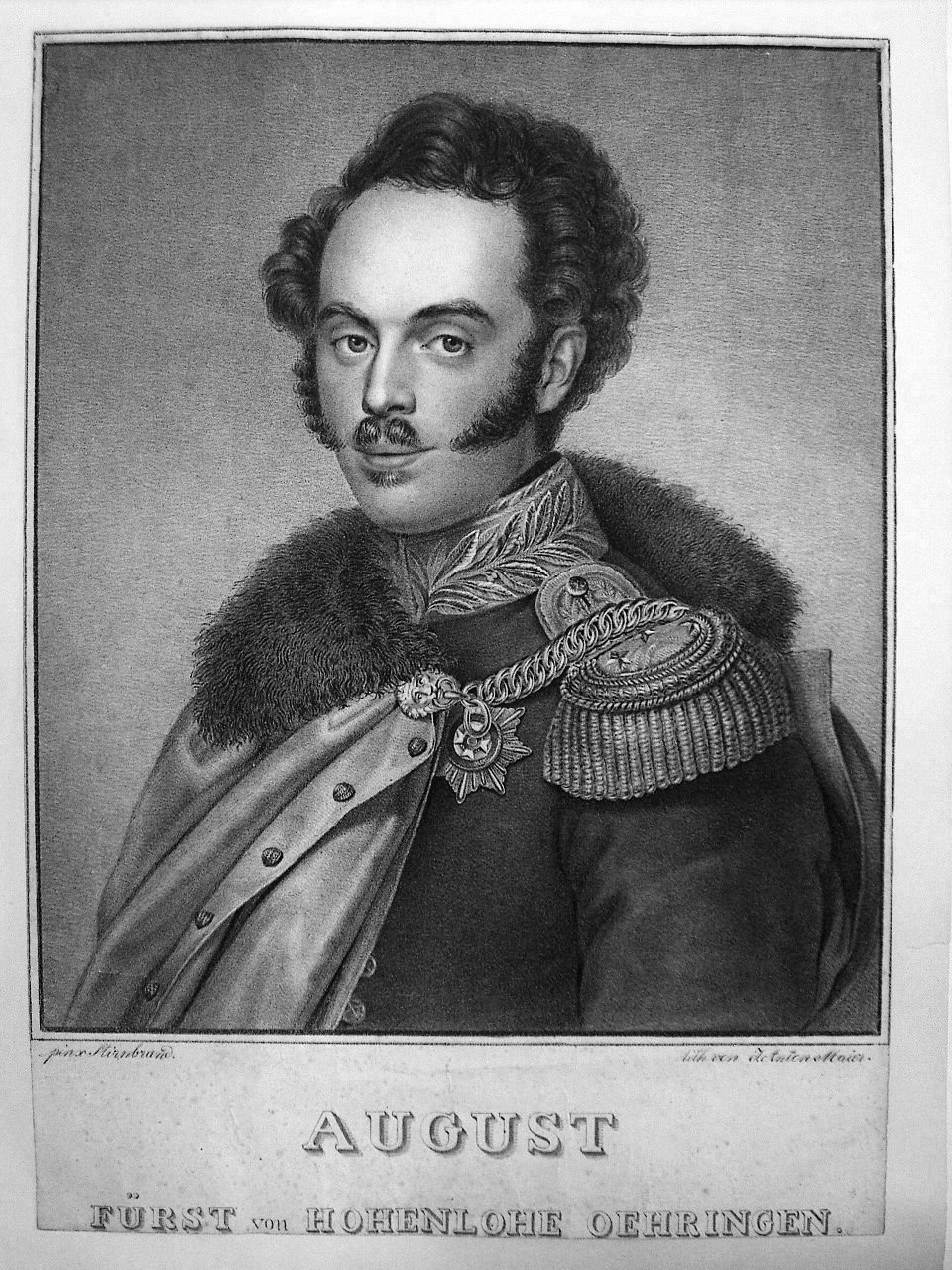
- August, Prince of Hohenlohe-Ingelfingen
- Born: 24 November 1784; Breslau, Silesia
- Died: 15 February 1853 (aged 68); Slawentzitz, Upper Silesia
- Spouse: Duchess Louise of Württemberg (m. 1811; died 1851)
- Issue: Prince Friedrich; Mathilde, Princess of Schwarzburg-Sondershausen; Hugo, Prince of Hohenlohe-Öhringen; Prince Felix
- House: House of Hohenlohe-Öhringen
- Father: Frederick Louis, Prince of Hohenlohe-Ingelfingen
- Mother: Countess Amalie von Hoym

Frederick August Charles, Prince of Hohenlohe-Öhringen (27 November 1784 – 15 February 1853) was a German general of the Napoleonic Wars and nobleman of the house of Hohenlohe.

== Early life ==
August was born on 27 November 1784 in Breslau. His parents were Frederick Louis, Prince of Hohenlohe-Ingelfingen (1748–1818) and Countess Maria Amalie von Hoy. His younger brother was Prince Adolf zu Hohenlohe-Ingelfingen who briefly served as Minister-President of Prussia in 1862 and was succeeded by Otto von Bismarck.

His father was the eldest son of Heinrich August, 1st Prince of Hohenlohe-Ingelfingen and Wilhelmine Eleonora von Hohenlohe-Öhringen. His nephew was Prince Kraft zu Hohenlohe-Ingelfingen. His maternal grandparents were Count Julius Gebhard von Hoym and Christiane Charlotte Sophie von Dieskau.

== Career ==
He was a German general during the Napoleonic Wars.

Upon his parents' marriage in 1782, his father acquired the estates of Slawentzitz, Ujest and Bitschin in Silesia, an area of 108 square miles. In August 1806 his family's lands were assigned by the German Mediatisation process to the new Kingdom of Württemberg. (Note: Prince August's son, Prince Hugo inherited these lands, besides his Franconian properties Öhringen and Neuenstein, and established calamine mines. He also founded one of the largest zinc smelting plants in the world. The Prussian King, William I, later German Emperor, created him Duke of Ujest upon his coronation in 1861.) In 1820–35 he was elected chairman of the "Kammer der Standesherren" (Upper House) of the Estates of Württemberg.

== Personal life ==
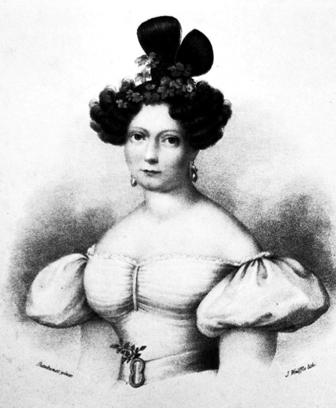
His wife, Louise of Württemberg

On 28 September 1811, he married Louise of Württemberg (4 June 1789 – 16 June 1851), a member of the Württemberg royal family. Luise was a daughter of Princess Louise of Stolberg-Gedern and Duke Eugen of Württemberg (the brother of Empress Maria Feodorovna, consort of Paul I of Russia) and a sister of Duke Eugen of Württemberg. They were the parents of:

- Prince Friedrich Ludwig Eugen Carl Adalbert Emil August of Hohenlohe-Öhringen (Öhringen, 12 August 1812 – Slawentzitz, 10 December 1892), who renounced his rights as firstborn son in 1842; he married Mathilde, Baroness von Brauneck (1821–1896) in 1844.
- Princess Friederike Mathilde of Hohenlohe-Öhringen (Öhringen, 3 July 1814 – Schloss Mirabell in Salzburg, 3 June 1888), who married Günther Friedrich Karl II, Prince of Schwarzburg-Sondershausen in 1835.
- Friedrich Wilhelm Eugen Karl Hugo, Prince of Hohenlohe-Öhringen, Duke of Ujest (Stuttgart, 27 May 1816 – Slawentzitz, 23 August 1897), who married Princess Pauline von Fürstenberg (1829–1900), youngest child of Amalie of Baden and Charles Egon II, Prince of Fürstenberg, in 1847.
- Prince Felix Eugen Wilhelm Ludwig Albrecht Karl of Hohenlohe-Öhringen (Öhringen, 1 March 1818 – Asnières, 8 September 1900), who married Princess Alexandrine von Hanau, Countess of Schaumburg (1830–1871), a daughter of Gertrude von Hanau and Frederick William, Elector of Hesse, in 1851.They had six children.

Prince August died on 15 February 1853 at Slawentzitz Castle.

=== Descendants ===
Through his son Hugo, he was the grandfather of Princess Margarethe of Hohenlohe-Öhringen (1865–1940), who was the second wife of Wilhelm of Hohenzollern, Count of Hohenau (himself a morganatic son of Prince Albert of Prussia).

== Gallery ==
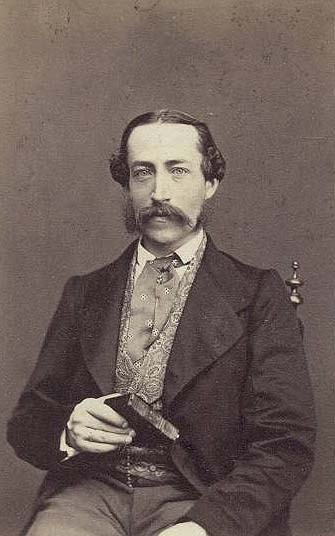
His second son, and heir, Hugo

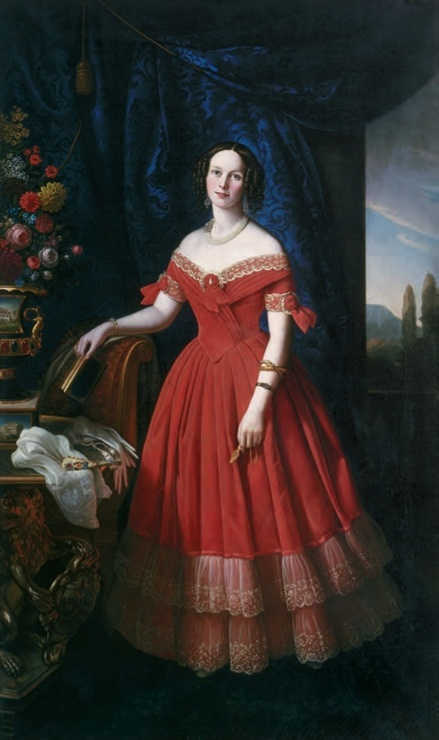
Portrait of his daughter, Mathilde, Princess of Schwarzburg-Sondershausen, 1841

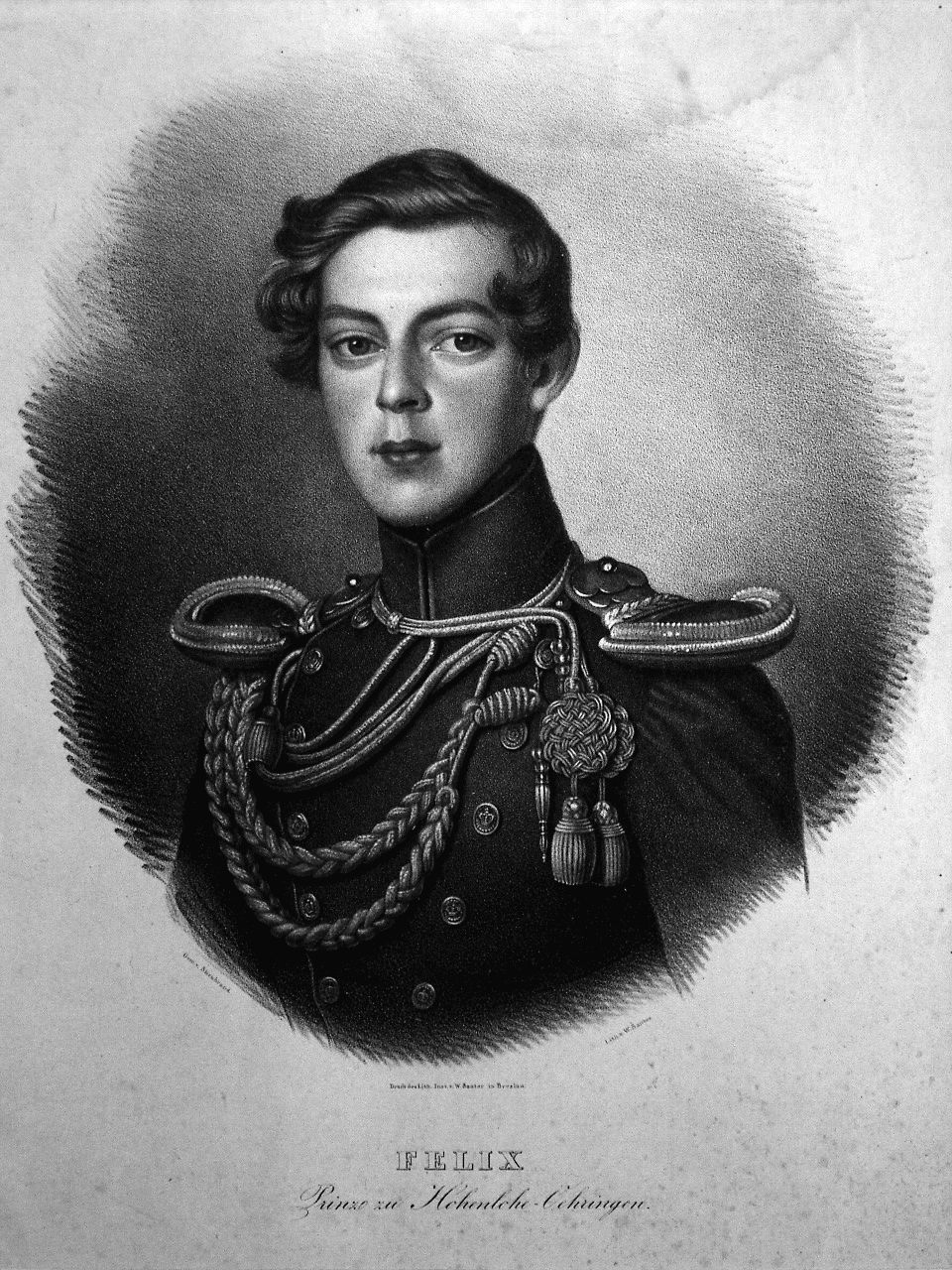
His youngest son, Felix

== Ancestry ==
Ancestors of August, Prince of Hohenlohe-Öhringen

8. Christian Kraft, Count of Hohenlohe-Ingelfingen
4. Heinrich August, Prince of Hohenlohe-Ingelfingen
9. Countess Maria Katharina of Hohenlohe-Pfedelbach
2. Friedrich Ludwig, Prince of Hohenlohe-Ingelfingen
10. Johann Friedrich II of Hohenlohe-Öhringen
5. Countess Wilhelmine Eleonore of Hohenlohe-Öhringen
11. Landgravine Dorothea Sophie of Hessen-Darmstadt
1. August, Prince of Hohenlohe-Öhringen
12. Count Ludwig Gerhard of Hoym
6. Count Julius Gebhard of Hoym
13. Countess Rahel Louise of Werthern
3. Countess Amalie of Hoym
14. Johann Adolph of Dieskau
7. Christiane Charlotte of Dieskau
15. Christiane Dorothea Magdalene of Ponickau

August, 3rd Prince of Hohenlohe-Öhringen House of Hohenlohe-Öhringen Cadet branch of the House of Hohenlohe Born: 27 November 1784 Died: 15 February 1853
German nobility
Preceded by Ludwig Friedrich Karl, 2nd Prince of Hohenlohe-Öhringen	Prince of Hohenlohe-Öhringen; 20 August 1806 – 1 January 1849	Succeeded by Hugo, 4th Prince of Hohenlohe-Öhringen
