= Charles Egon III, Prince of Fürstenberg =

Charles Egon III
- Prince of Fürstenberg
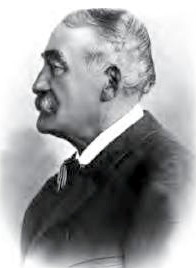
- Charles Egon III c. 1890

Head of the House of Fürstenberg
- Tenure: 1854–1892
- Predecessor: Charles Egon II
- Successor: Charles Egon IV
- Born: Karl Egon III. Leopold Maria Wilhelm Maximilian; 4 March 1820; Donaueschingen, Grand Duchy of Baden, German Confederation
- Died: 15 March 1892 (aged 72); Paris, France
- Spouse: Princess Elisabeth Reuss of Greiz (m. 1844; died 1861)
- Issue: Princess Amelie of Fürstenberg; Charles Egon IV, Prince of Fürstenberg
- House: Fürstenberg
- Father: Charles Egon II, Prince of Fürstenberg
- Mother: Amalie of Baden

Charles Egon III of Fürstenberg (German: Karl Egon III Leopold Maria Wilhelm Maximilian Fürst zu Fürstenberg; 4 March 1820 – 15 March 1892) was an officer in the armies of the Grand Duchy of Baden and the Kingdom of Prussia, rising to Cavalry General.

== Early life ==
He was born in Donaueschingen in Baden-Württemberg on 4 March 1820. He was the son of Charles Egon II, Prince of Fürstenberg and Amalie of Baden. Among his siblings were Princess Marie Elisabeth, Princess Maria Amalia (who married Viktor I of Hohenlohe-Schillingsfürst, Duke of Ratibor), Prince Maximilian Egon I (who married Countess Leontine von Khevenhüller-Metsch), Prince Emil Egon (who married Countess Leontine von Khevenhüller-Metsch after his brother's death), and Princess Pauline Wilhelmine (who married Hugo, Prince of Hohenlohe-Oehringen).

His father was the only son of the Austrian General Karl Aloys zu Fürstenberg (a grandson of Joseph Wilhelm Ernst, Prince of Fürstenberg) and Princess Elisabeth von Thurn und Taxis (a daughter of Alexander Ferdinand, 3rd Prince of Thurn and Taxis). His maternal grandparents were Charles Frederick, Grand Duke of Baden, and his second wife, Louise Caroline of Hochberg. As his grandparents' marriage was morganatic, his mother was born without princely status and excluded from the dynastic line of the House of Zähringen. She was accorded her mother's baronial status until 1796, when her mother was made Countess of Hochberg, at which time she assumed comital rank.

== Career ==
From 1854 to 1892 he was also the senior member of the Swabian line of the House of Fürstenberg. Due to his extensive estates he was a member of the Prussian House of Lords, the upper chamber of Baden and the upper chamber of the Estates of Württemberg. From 1864 to 1892 he was president of the Association of German Standesherren.

== Personal life ==
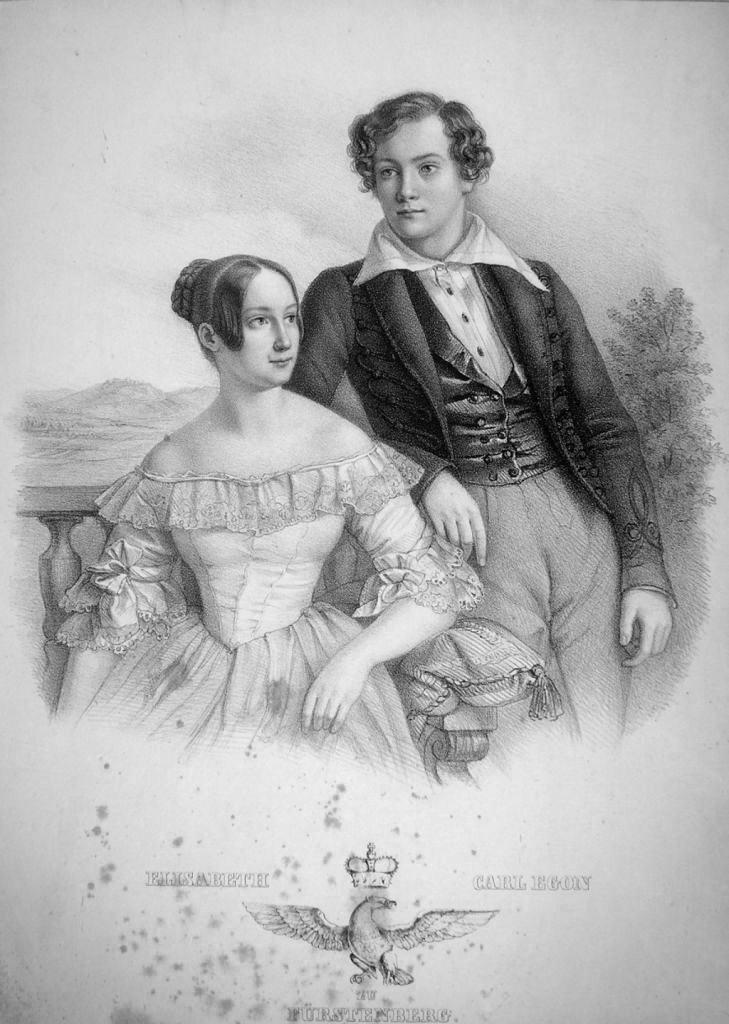
Lithograph of Princess Elisabeth and Prince Charles Egon III

In 1844, he married Princess Elisabeth Reuss of Greiz (1824–1861), the daughter of Heinrich XIX, Prince Reuss of Greiz and Princess Gasparine of Rohan-Rochefort. Her elder sister, Princess Louise Caroline Reuss of Greiz, married Prince Eduard of Saxe-Altenburg, and, after his death in 1852, Prince Heinrich IV Reuss of Köstritz. Before her death on 7 May 1861, they were the parents of:

- Princess Amelie of Fürstenberg (1848–1918), who never married.
- Charles Egon IV, Prince of Fürstenberg (1852–1896), who married Countess Dorothée de Talleyrand-Périgord, a daughter of Duke Napoléon-Louis de Talleyrand-Périgord and Pauline de Castellane (a daughter of Marshal Boniface de Castellane).

He died in Paris and was succeeded by his son Charles Egon IV.

== Ancestry ==
Ancestors of Charles Egon III, Prince of Fürstenberg

8. Charles Egon I, Prince of Fürstenberg
4. Charles Aloys, Prince of Fürstenberg
9. Countess Maria Josepha von Sternberg
2. Charles Egon II, Prince of Fürstenberg
10. Alexander Ferdinand, 3rd Prince of Thurn and Taxis
5. Princess Elisabeth of Thurn and Taxis
11. Princess Maria Henriette Josepha of Fürstenberg
1. Charles Egon III, Prince of Fürstenberg
12. Frederick, Hereditary Prince of Baden-Durlach
6. Charles Frederick, Grand Duke of Baden
13. Princess Amalia of Nassau-Dietz
3. Princess Amalie of Baden
14. Baron Ludwig Heinrich Geyer von Geyersberg
7. Baroness Caroline Louise Geyer von Geyersberg
15. Countess Maximiliana Christiane von Sponeck

== Bibliography ==
- Kurt von Priesdorff: Soldatisches Führertum. Band 8, Hanseatische Verlagsanstalt Hamburg, ohne Jahr, S. 151.
- Friedrich von Weech (1904). "Fürstenberg, Karl Egon (III.) Fürst zu" . Allgemeine Deutsche Biographie (in German). Vol. 49. Leipzig: Duncker & Humblot. pp. 214–216.
- C. F. Gutmann: Carl Egon III Fürst zu Fürstenberg. in: Schriften des Vereins für Geschichte und Naturgeschichte der Baar und der angrenzenden Landesteile in Donaueschingen. VIII. Heft 1893, Tübingen 1893. S. 1–44. online (PDF; 22,9 MB)
