= Richard Lauchert =

German painter

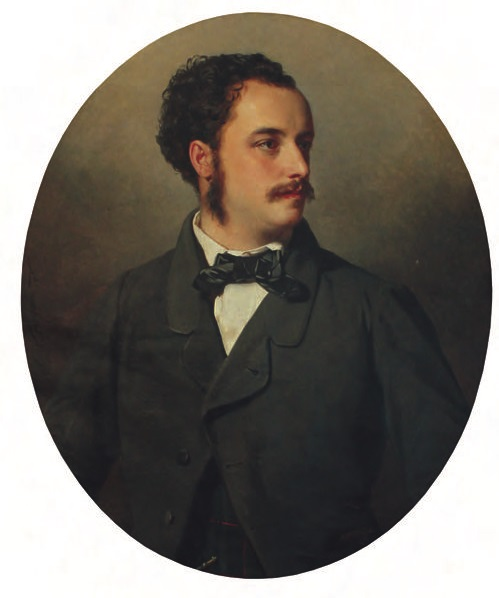
- Born: 4 February 1823; Sigmaringen
- Died: 27 December 1868 (aged 45); Berlin
- Spouse: Princess Amalie Adelheid of Hohenlohe-Schillingsfürst (m. 1857; died 1868)
- Children: 5
- Parent(s): Joseph Lauchert; Maria Waldburga Guttenberg

Richard Lauchert (4 February 1823 – 27 December 1868) was a German portrait painter who was mostly employed by the courts of Germany, England, and Russia, and painted portraits with great taste and ability, but many of his earlier productions are inferior to those of his later period.

== Early life ==
Lauchert was born in Sigmaringen on 4 February 1823. He was the son of the Court Chamberlain Joseph Lauchert and his wife Maria Waldburga Guttenberg.

Like his six brothers, he attended the Hedinger Progymnasium and then the Grand Ducal Baden Lyceum in Konstan.

== Career ==
He was supported from an early age by Prince Karl Anton von Hohenzollern-Sigmaringen. From 1839, he studied at the Academy of Fine Arts in Munich under Peter von Cornelius and attended the painting school there led by Joseph Bernhardt where his focus was on nudes and portraits. In 1845 he went to Paris and worked for a time with Franz Xaver Winterhalter.

In 1858 he settled in Berlin as a freelance painter and was considered a "painter for the highest circles of society". He worked as a court painter at the Berlin court and portrayed, among others, Lieutenant Colonel Baron Helmuth von Moltke.

Lauchert became court painter to the Hohenzollern family and enjoyed extraordinary popularity as a portrait painter among the aristocracy. He created paintings (mostly portraits) for most courts in Germany, Russia, and England that demonstrate an elegant, sometimes somewhat sweet, approach and a masterful treatment of flesh tones and textiles.

=== Gallery ===
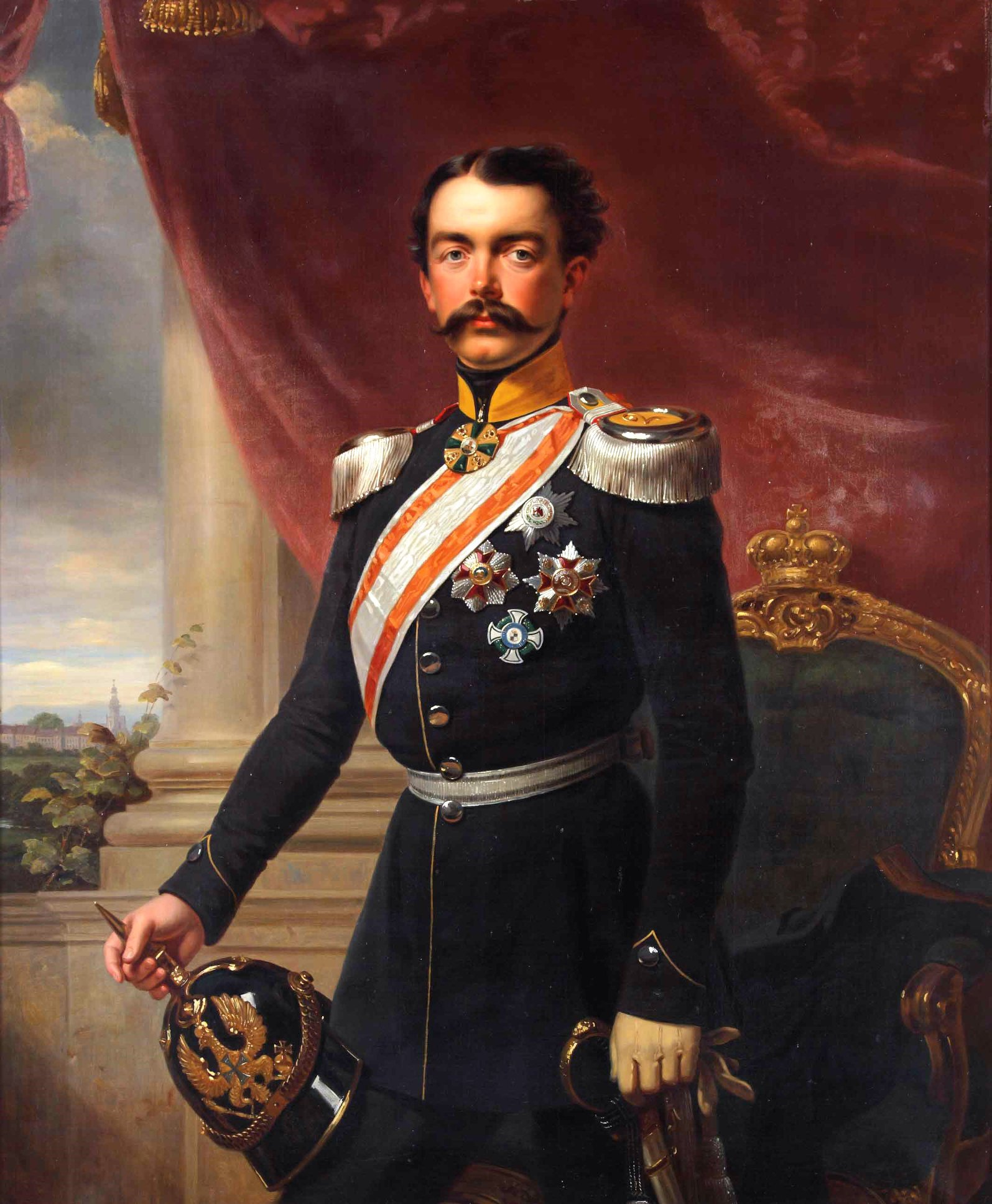
Viktor I, Duke of Ratibor, 1845

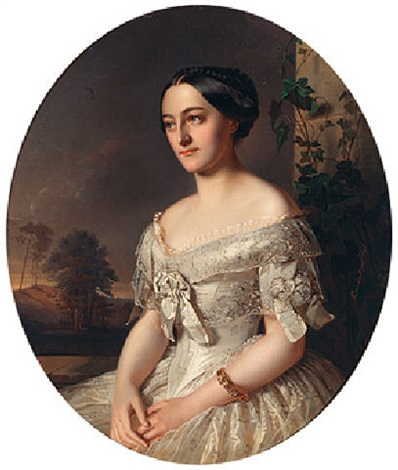
Princess Pauline of Fürstenberg (later Princess of Hohenlohe-Öhringen), 1851

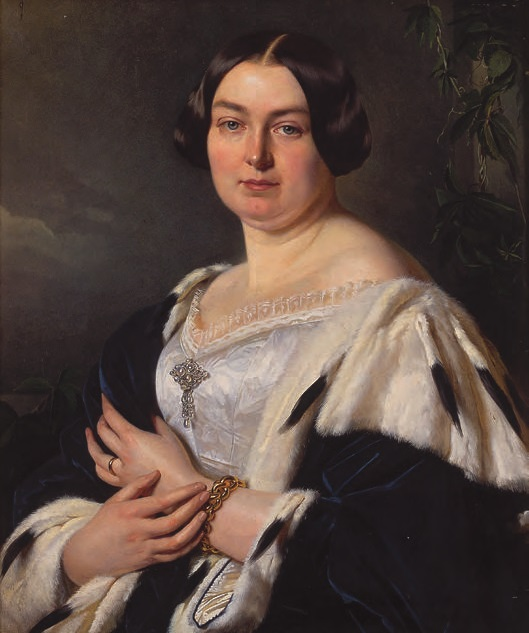
Princess Katharina of Hohenlohe-Waldenburg-Schillingsfürst, 1853

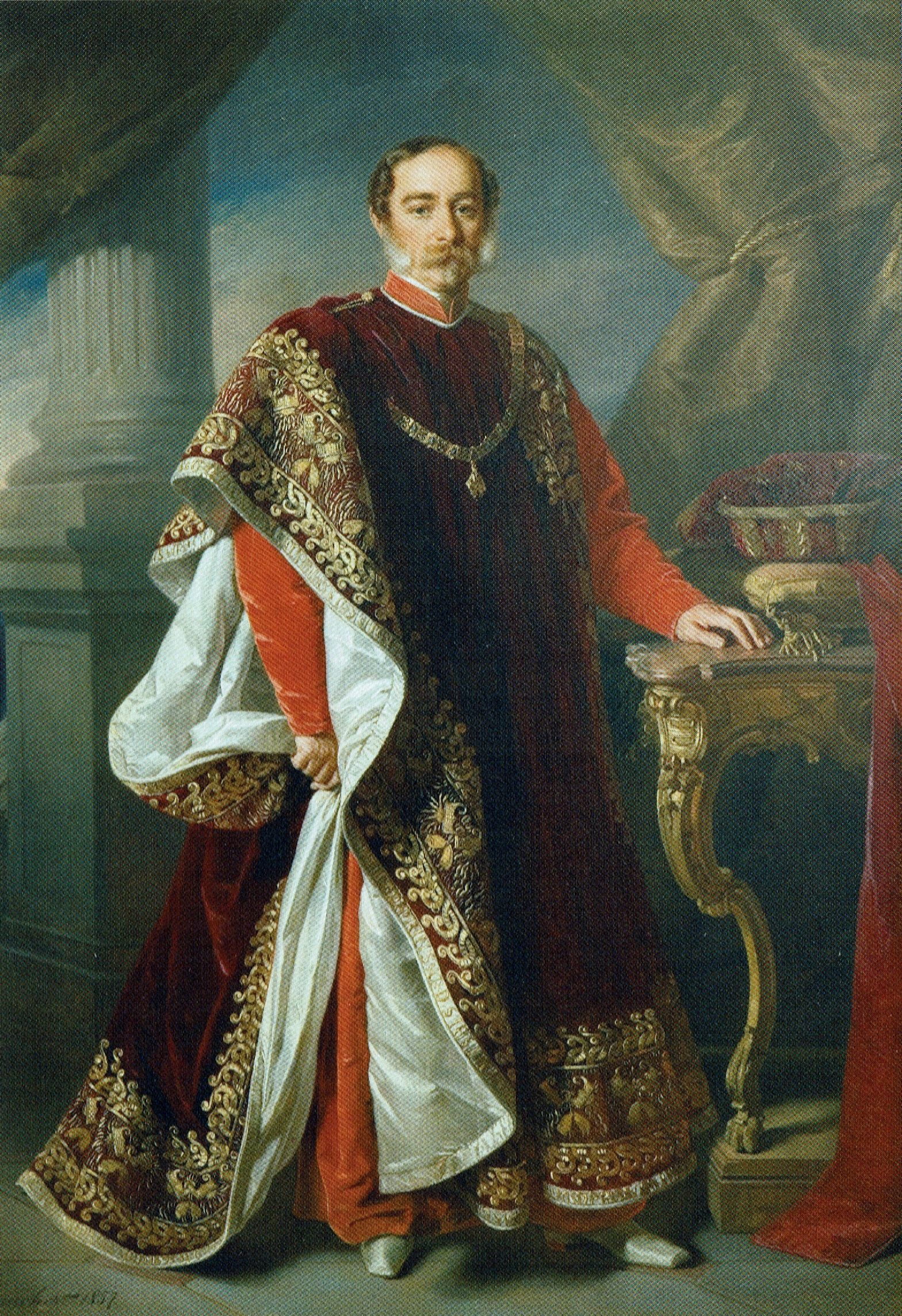
Charles Egon II, Prince of Fürstenberg, 1854

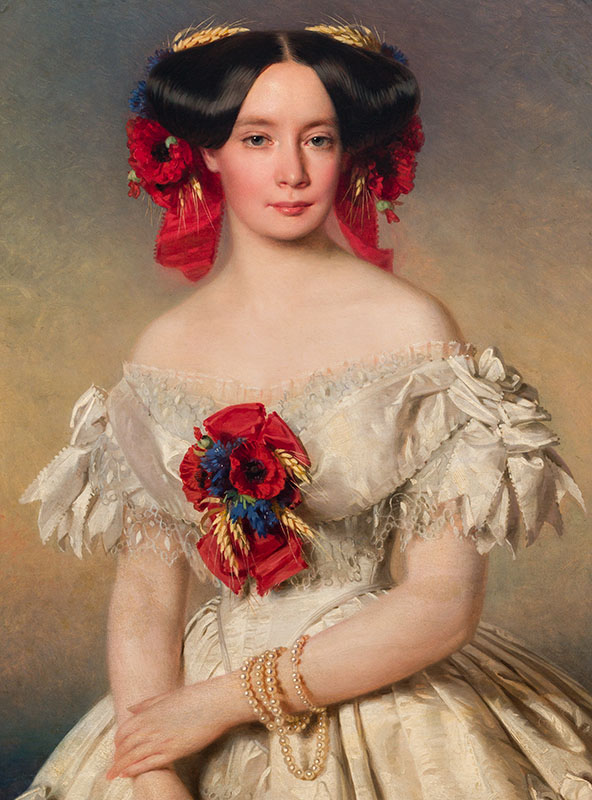
Sophie, Grand Duchess of Saxe-Weimar-Eisenach, 1855

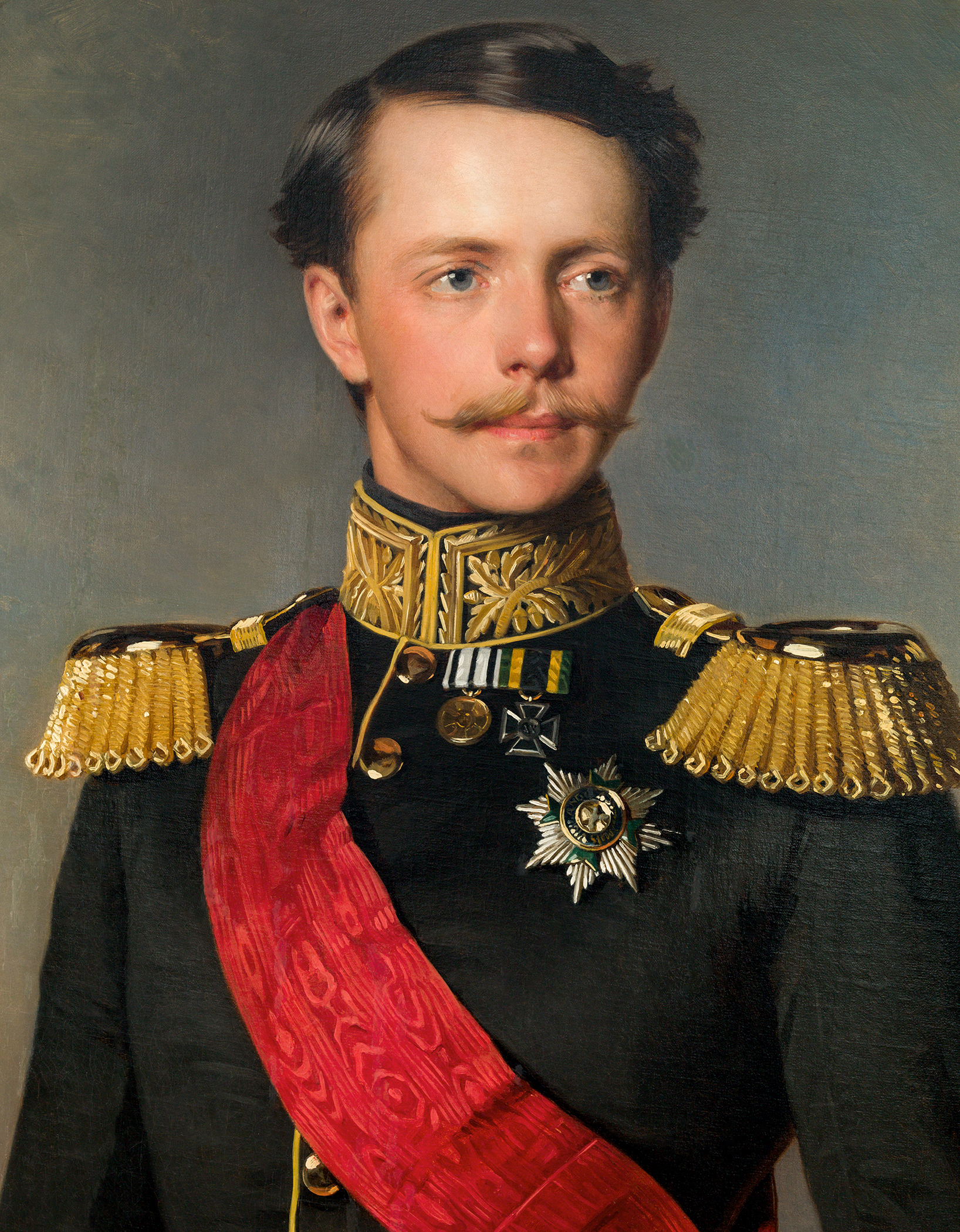
Charles Alexander, Grand Duke of Saxe-Weimar-Eisenach, 1855

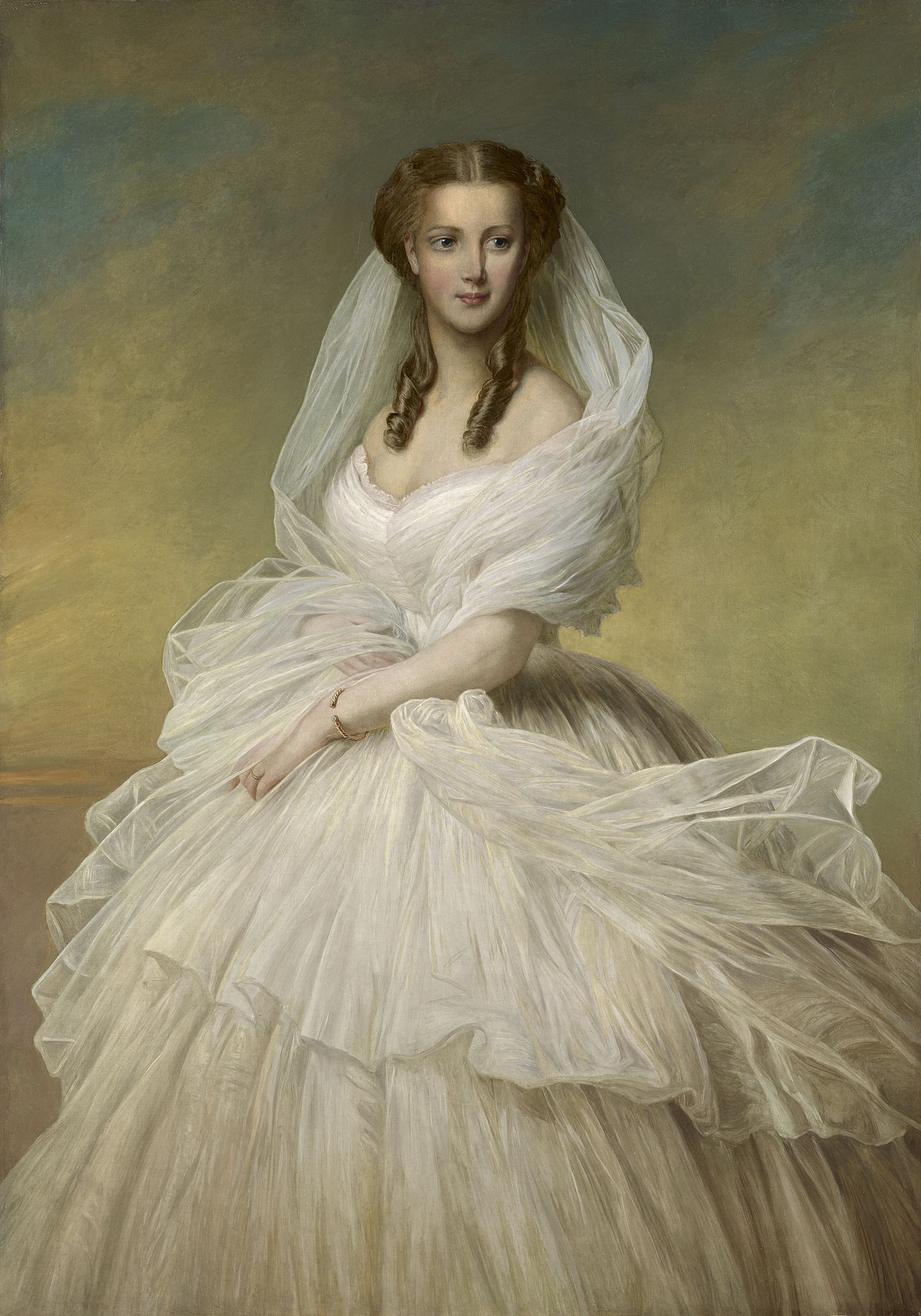
Princess Alexandra of Denmark (later Queen consort of the United Kingdom), 1862

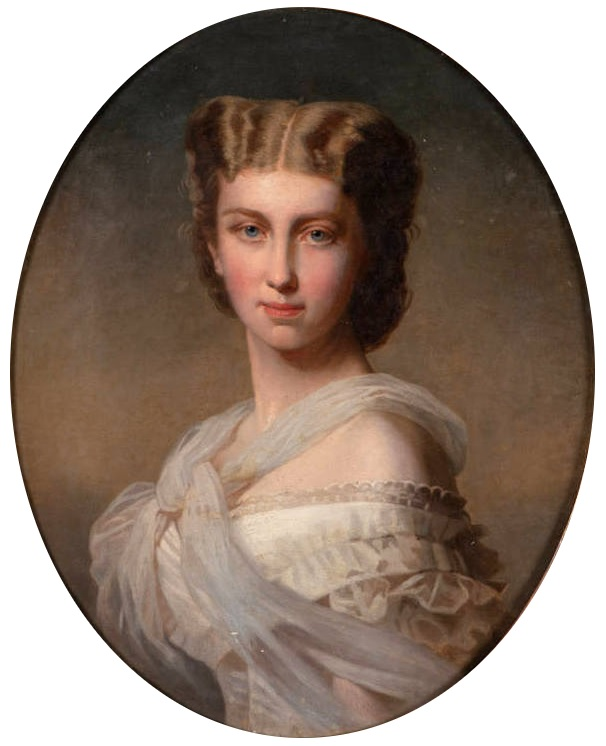
Marie de Castellane, Princess Radziwiłł, 1864

== Personal life ==
On 30 April 1857 in Herbsleben near Gotha, he married Princess Amalie Adelheid of Hohenlohe-Schillingsfürst (1821–1902) against the wishes of her family. She was a daughter of Franz Joseph, Prince of Hohenlohe-Schillingsfürst and Princess Constanze of Hohenlohe-Langenburg. Among her siblings were Prince Viktor I, Duke of Ratibor, whose portrait he painted in 1845. According to her brother Chlodwig's memoir:

"The resulting estrangement lasted but a few years. Princess Salm writes on the subject: 'Later on my sister was reconciled to all my and passed many a happy hour again with my brother Chlodwig. My brothers came to see that the man for whom she had given up all was entirely worthy of her. He was not only a talented artist but an admirable and wholly trustworthy character.'".

The couple had five children, of whom only three reached adulthood. Lauchert died in Berlin on 27 December 1868.
