= Charles Egon II of Fürstenberg =

German politician (1796–1854)

Charles Egon II
- Prince of Fürstenberg
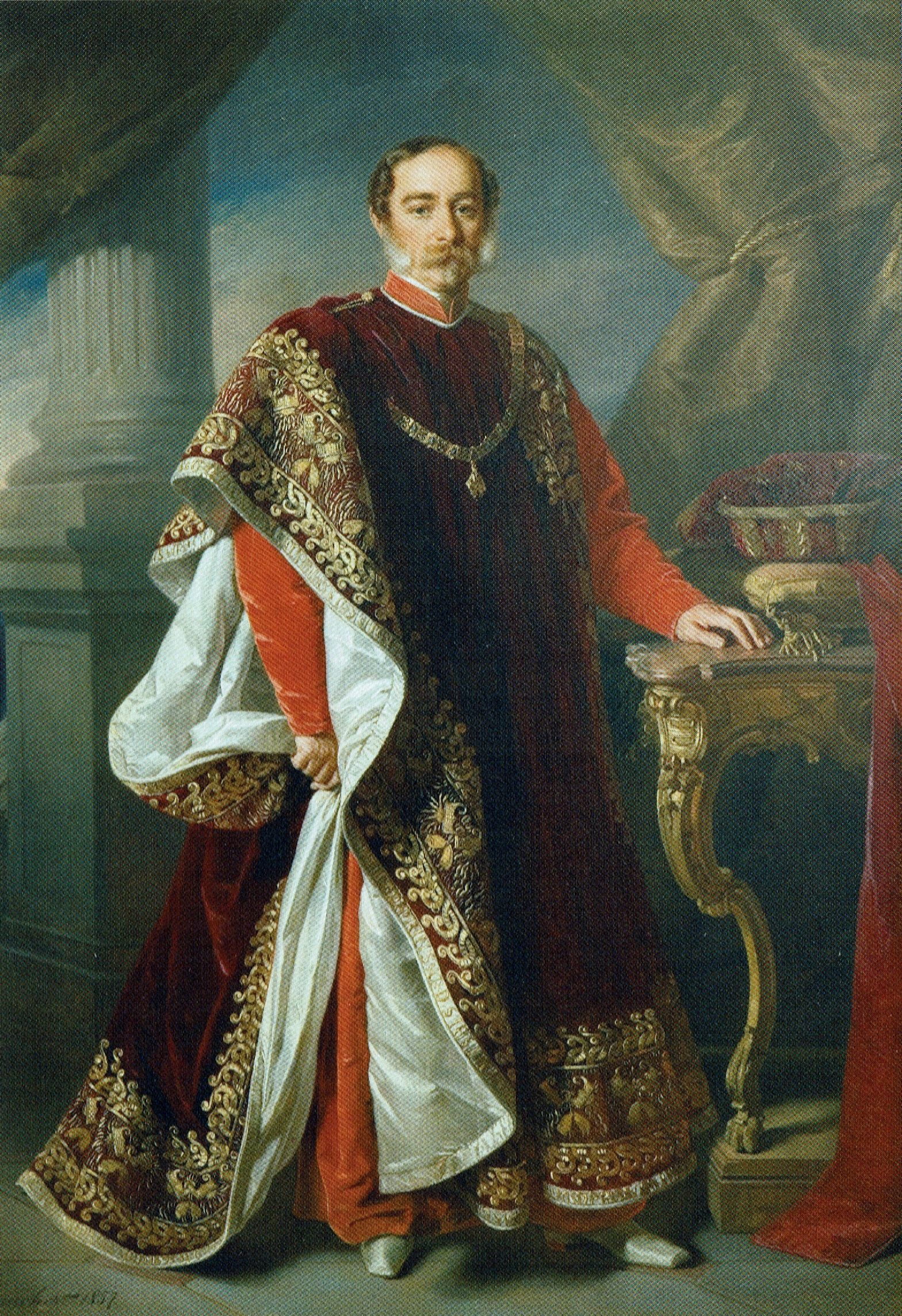
- Portrait by Richard Lauchert

Head of the House of Fürstenberg
- Tenure: 1804–1854
- Predecessor: Karl Joachim
- Successor: Charles Egon III
- Born: Karl Egon II; 28 October 1796; Prague, Kingdom of Bohemia
- Died: 22 October 1854 (aged 57)
- Spouse: Amalie of Baden (m. 1818)
- Issue: Princess Marie Elisabeth; Charles Egon III, Prince of Fürstenberg; Princess Maria Amalia; Prince Maximilian Egon I Princess Marie Henriette; Prince Emil Egon; Princess Pauline Wilhelmine
- House: Fürstenberg
- Father: Karl Aloys zu Fürstenberg
- Mother: Elisabeth von Thurn und Taxis

Charles Egon II, Prince of Fürstenberg (German: Karl Egon II. Fürst zu Fürstenberg; 28 October 1796 – 22 October 1854) was a German politician and nobleman. From 1804 to 1806 he was the last reigning prince of Furstenburg before its mediatisation, whilst still in his minority. He also served as the first-ever vice-president of the Upper Chamber of the Badische Ständeversammlung.

== Life ==
=== Minority ===
He was born in Prague, the only son of the Austrian general Karl Aloys zu Fürstenberg and Princess Elisabeth von Thurn und Taxis. Soon after his father's death on 25 March 1799 his cousin Charles Gabriel also died aged only fourteen (13 December 1799) - Charles Gabriel had been the last scion of the Bohemian Fürstenberg-Pürglitz line and this left the branch extinct. His uncle Karl Joachim, the last male survivor of the Swabian line, died in 1804, leaving that too extinct. This meant that in 1804 Charles Egon inherited almost all the Fürstenberg possessions except those of Fürstenberg-Taikowitz, the Moravian line which still had surviving issue.

Charles was only seven years old when he succeeded, so his mother and Landgraf Joachim Egon von Fürstenberg, a distant uncle from the Moravian line, became his guardians and regents, though most of the actual governing was done by Joseph von Laßberg. In 1806 the princedom of Fürstenberg was abolished by the Treaty of the Confederation of the Rhine. Elisabeth and Laßberg tried in vain to get this reversed at the 1814 Congress of Vienna.

He studied at Freiburg and Würzburg. In 1815 he accompanied Prince Schwarzenberg to Paris as staff-officer.

=== Majority and marriage ===
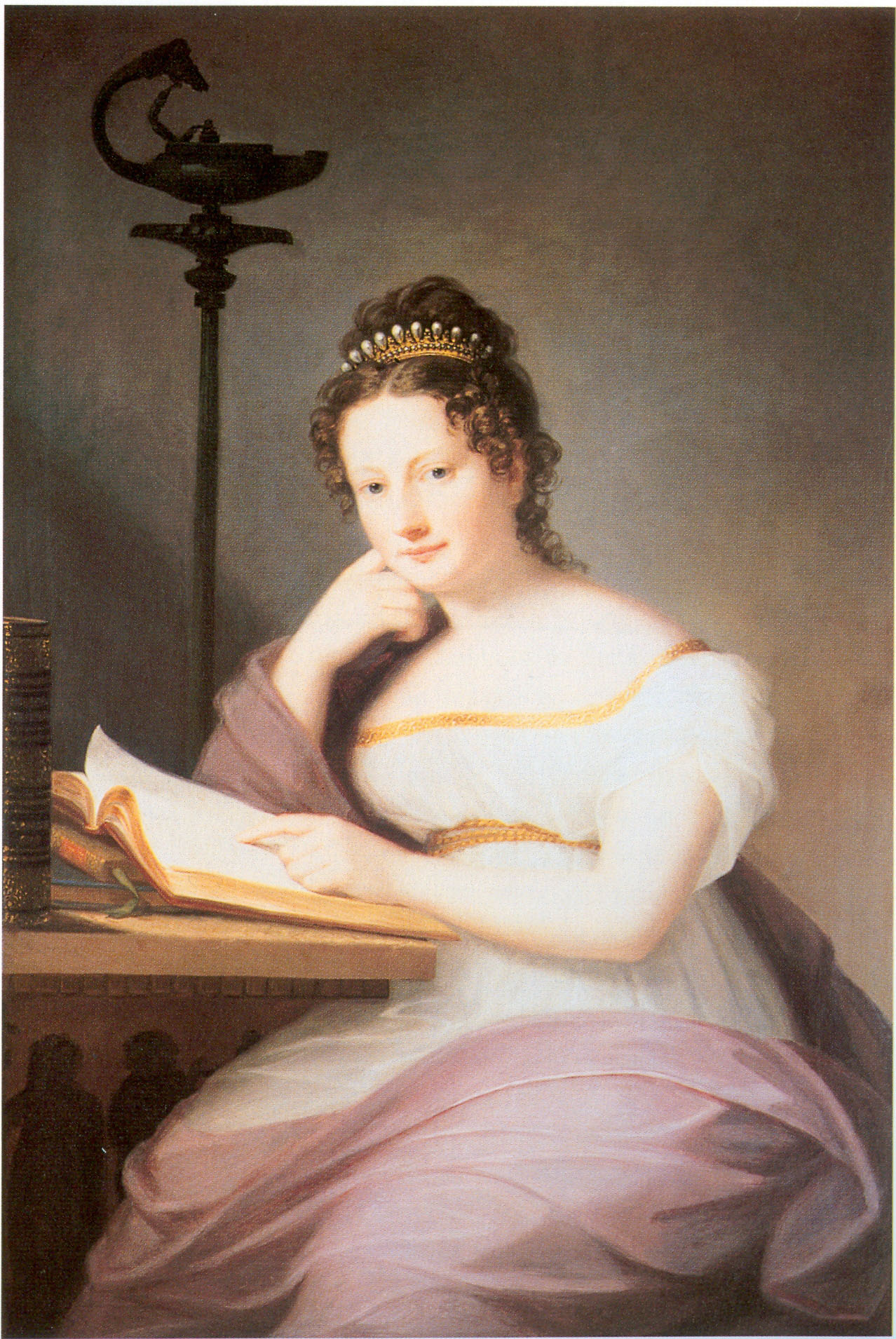
His wife Amalie in 1819

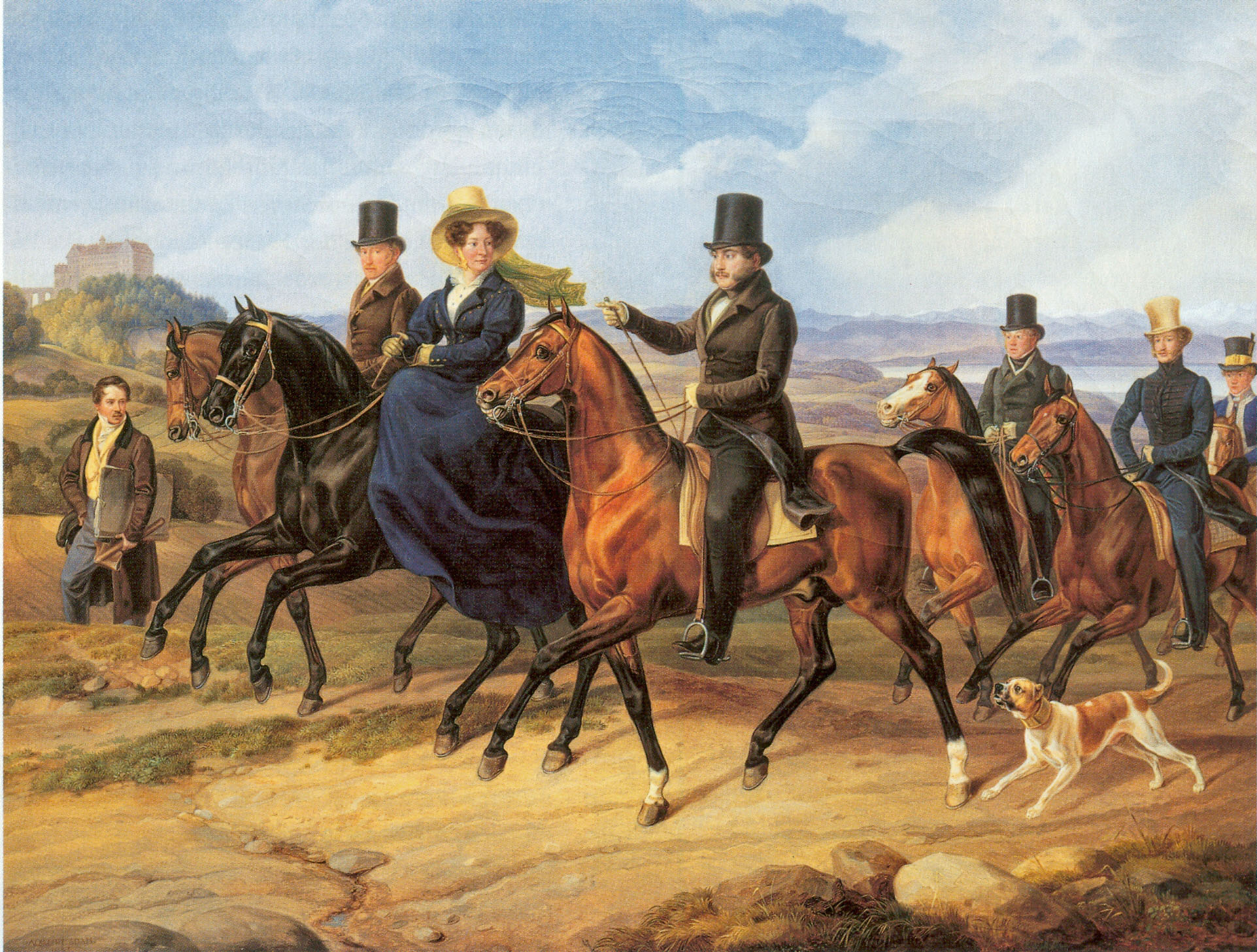
Albrecht Adam: A ride in front of Schloss Heiligenberg (1831) – Charles Egon II and his wife Amalie of Baden with courtiers.

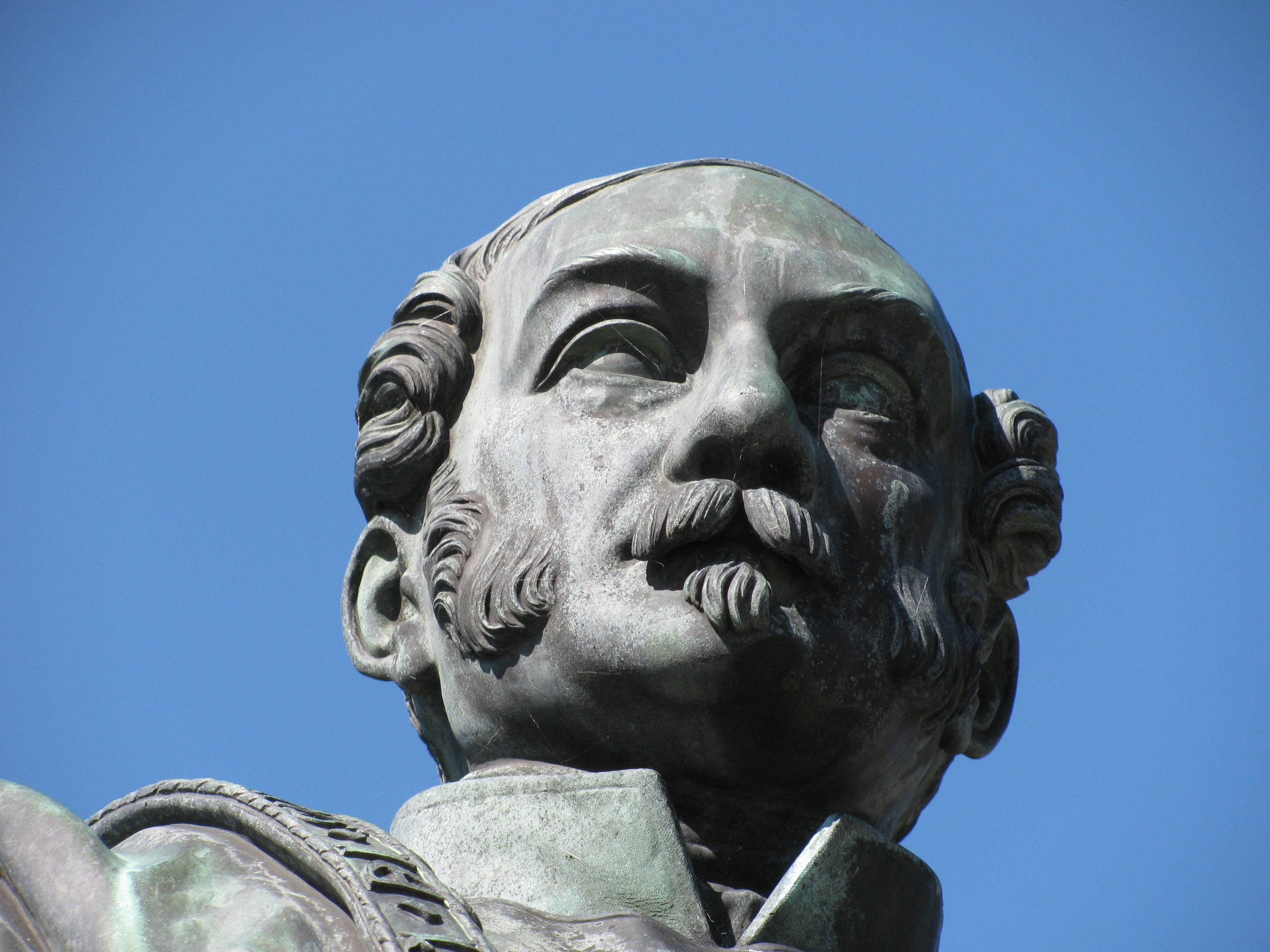
Charles Egon II, Prince of Fürstenberg (Heiligenberger Fürstenbrunnen)

Thus by the time he reached majority in 1817 Charles Egon was not a sovereign prince but a "Grundherr" possessing large estates, woods and industrial sites, as well as a Standesherr of the three states between which Fürstenberg had been divided—the Grand Duchy of Baden, the Kingdom of Württemberg and the Principality of Hohenzollern-Sigmaringen.

He owned Bohemian estate of 98,379 acres.

On 19 April 1818 he married Amalie of Baden, a daughter of Charles Frederick, Grand Duke of Baden and his second wife Louise Caroline, Countess von Hochberg.

Since her mother was a morganatic wife, so too was Amalie - although Charles, Grand Duke of Baden later elevated her to dynastic status (she was his father's half-sister), making her the first "princess" of Baden, which allowed Charles Egon's mother Elisabeth Alexandrine to finally accept the couple as a marriage of equals.

=== Political life ===
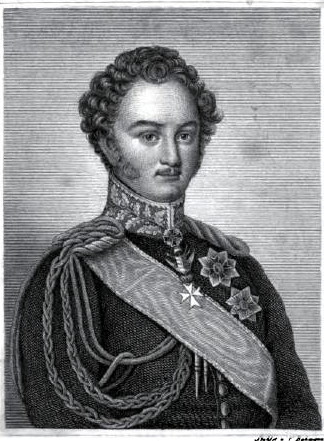
Engraving of Charles Egon II, c. 1833

Charles's Standesherr status entitled him to sit in the Badische Ständeversammlung, of which chamber he became the first vice-president, holding that office for thirty-three years from 1819 to 1852, whilst its president was Prince William of Baden.

His estates also meant he sat in the Upper Chamber of the Estates of Württemberg (whose vice-presidency he also held several times) from 1819 and in the Prussian House of Lords from 1850. History records him as a relatively progressive and unbiased for his time.

For example, during the full sitting of the German Confederation's landtag in 1831, he played a significant part in getting the upper chamber to approve the Liberal Press Act, put forward by the government under pressure from the lower chamber. This removed censorship, at least for home affairs in Baden. He was also influential in the abolition of tithes and feudal duties.

=== Charitable work ===
Charles was also distinguished by his large charities; among other foundations he established a hospital at Donaueschingen. For the industrial development of the country, too, he did much, and proved himself also a notable patron of the arts.

His palace of Donaueschingen, with its collections of paintings, engravings and coins, was a centre of culture, where poets, painters and musicians met with princely entertainment.

== Issue ==
With Amalie he had seven children:

- Princess Marie Elisabeth (1819–1897), who died unmarried.
- Charles Egon III, Prince of Fürstenberg (1820–1892)
- Princess Maria Amalia (1821–1899), who married Viktor I of Hohenlohe-Schillingsfürst, Duke of Ratibor, the eldest son of Franz Joseph, Prince of Hohenlohe-Schillingsfürst and Princess Constanze of Hohenlohe-Langenburg, in 1845.
- Prince Maximilian Egon I (1822–1873), who married Countess Leontine von Khevenhüller-Metsch, a daughter of Richard, 5th Prince of Khevenhüller-Metsch and Countess Antonia Maria Lichnowsky (a daughter of Prince Eduárd Lichnowsky) in 1860.
- Princess Marie Henriette (1823–1834), who died young.
- Prince Emil Egon of Fürstenberg (1825–1899), who married his brother's widow, Countess Leontine von Khevenhüller-Metsch, in 1875.
- Princess Pauline Wilhelmine (1829–1900), who married Hugo, Prince of Hohenlohe-Oehringen, a son of August, Prince of Hohenlohe-Öhringen and his wife, Duchess Louise of Württemberg (a daughter of Princess Louise of Stolberg-Gedern and Duke Eugen of Württemberg) in 1847.

== Honours ==
- Baden:
  - Grand Cross of the House Order of Fidelity, 1806
  - Grand Cross of the Order of the Zähringer Lion, 1817
- Württemberg: Grand Cross of the Order of the Württemberg Crown, 1826
- Austrian Empire:
  - Knight of the Order of the Golden Fleece, 1836
  - Grand Cross of the Royal Hungarian Order of Saint Stephen, 1849
- (Saxe-Coburg and Gotha) (Duchy of Saxe-Altenburg) (Saxe-Meiningen) Ernestine duchies: Grand Cross of the Saxe-Ernestine House Order, May 1842
- Kingdom of Prussia: Knight of the Order of the Black Eagle, 18 January 1851

== Ancestry ==
Ancestors of Charles Egon II of Fürstenberg

8. Joseph Wilhelm Ernst, Prince of Fürstenberg
4. Charles Egon I, Prince of Fürstenberg
9. Countess Maria Anna von Waldstein-Wartenberg
2. Charles Aloys, Prince of Fürstenberg
10. Count Franz Philipp von Sternberg
5. Countess Maria Josepha von Sternberg
11. Countess Leopoldine von Starhemberg
1. Charles Egon II, Prince of Fürstenberg
12. Anselm Franz, 2nd Prince of Thurn and Taxis
6. Alexander Ferdinand, 3rd Prince of Thurn and Taxis
13. Princess Maria Ludovika Anna von Lobkowicz
3. Princess Elisabeth of Thurn and Taxis
14. Joseph Wilhelm Ernst, Prince of Fürstenberg (= 8)
7. Princess Maria Henriette Josepha of Fürstenberg
15. Countess Maria Anna von Waldstein-Wartenberg (= 9)

== Bibliography (in German) ==
- Karl Siegfried Bader: Fürstin Elisabeth zu Fürstenberg im Kampf um die Erhaltung der Rechte ihres mediatisierten Hauses, in: Schriften des Vereins für Geschichte und Naturgeschichte der Baar und der angrenzenden Landesteile in Donaueschingen, XXIV. Heft 1956, Donaueschingen 1956; S. 119–153. online (PDF; 43,9 MB)
- Friedrich von Weech: Karl Egon Fürst zu Fürstenberg, in: Friedrich von Weech (Herausgeber): Badische Biographien, Erster Theil, Heidelberg 1875, S. 272–274. (Digitalisat)
- Friedrich von Weech (1878). "Fürstenberg, Karl Egon Fürst zu" . Allgemeine Deutsche Biographie (in German). Vol. 8. Leipzig: Duncker & Humblot. pp. 227–228.
