= Amalie of Baden =

German princess

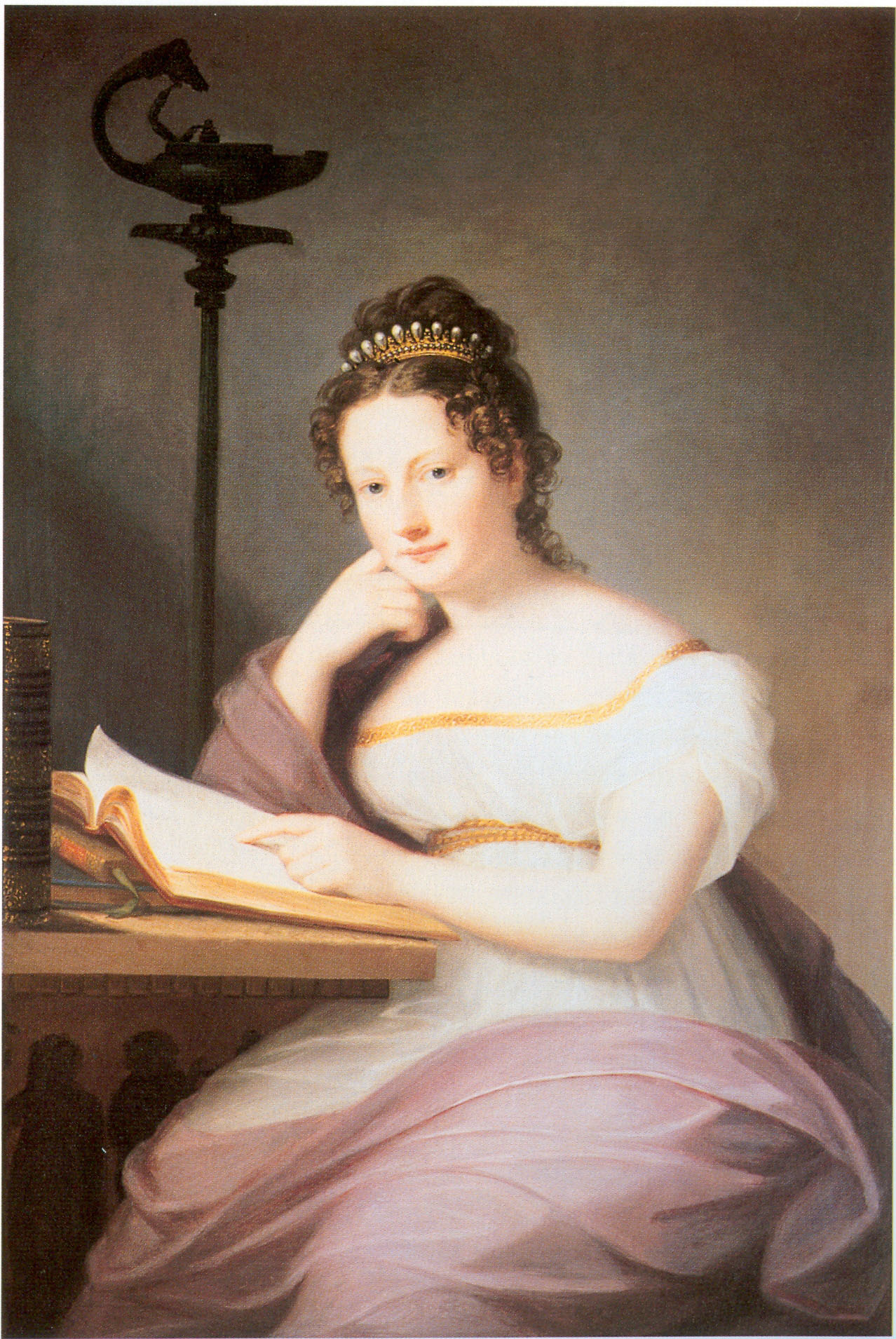
- Portrait by Marie Ellenrieder

Princess consort of Fürstenberg
- Reign: 19 April 1818 – 22 October 1854
- Born: Baroness Amalie of Hochberg; 26 January 1795; Karlsruhe Palace, Karlsruhe, Margraviate of Baden, Holy Roman Empire
- Died: 14 September 1869 (aged 74); Karlsruhe, Grand Duchy of Baden, German Empire
- Spouse: Charles Egon II, Prince of Fürstenberg (m. 1818; died 1854)
- Issue: Princess Marie Elisabeth; Charles Egon III, Prince of Fürstenberg; Princess Marie Amelie; Prince Maximilian Egon I; Prince Marie Henriette; Prince Emil Egon; Princess Pauline Wilhelmine
Names
- Amalie Christina Caroline
- House: Zähringen
- Father: Charles Frederick, Grand Duke of Baden
- Mother: Louise Caroline of Hochberg

Amalie, Princess of Fürstenberg (Amalie Christina Caroline; née Baroness Amalie of Hochberg, formerly Countess Amalie of Hochberg and Princess Amalie of Baden; 26 January 1795 – 14 September 1869) was the consort of Charles Egon II, Prince of Fürstenberg.

== Biography ==
Baroness Amalie of Hochberg was born on 26 January 1795 in Karlsruhe to Charles Frederick, Grand Duke of Baden, and his second wife, Louise Caroline of Hochberg. Her parents' marriage was morganatic, and so Amalie was born without princely status and excluded from the dynastic line of the House of Zähringen. She was accorded her mother's baronial status until 1796, when her mother was made Countess of Hochberg, at which time she assumed comital rank.

Amalie's half-nephew, Charles, Grand Duke of Baden, elevated her and her siblings to dynastic status in 1817, granting them princely rank and status with the style of Grand Ducal Highness.

On 19 April 1818 she married Charles Egon II of Fürstenberg, becoming the princess consort of Fürstenberg.

Amalie and Charles Egon II had seven children:

- Marie Elisabeth (15 March 1819 – 9 April 1897)
- Karl Egon III. (4 March 1820 – 15 March 1892)
- Marie Amélie (12 February 1821 – 17 January 1899); married on 19 April 1845 Viktor I of Hohenlohe-Schillingsfürst, Duke of Ratibor.
- Maximilian Egon I (29 March 1822 – 27 July 1873); married 23 May 1860 Countess Leontine von Khevenhüller-Metsch.
- Marie Henriette (16 July 1823 – 19 September 1834)
- Emil Egon (12 September 1825 – 15 May 1899); married on 31 May 1875 Countess Leontine von Khevenhüller-Metsch.
- Pauline Wilhelmine (11 June 1829 – 3 August 1900); married on 15 April 1847 Hugo, Prince of Hohenlohe-Oehringen.

Amalie died on 14 September 1869.

== Ancestry ==
Ancestors of Amalie of Baden

8. Charles III William, Margrave of Baden-Durlach
4. Frederick, Hereditary Prince of Baden-Durlach
9. Duchess Magdalena Wilhelmine of Württemberg
2. Charles Frederick, Grand Duke of Baden
10. John William Friso, Prince of Orange
5. Princess Amalia of Nassau-Dietz
11. Landgravine Marie Louise of Hesse-Kassel
1. Princess Amalie of Baden
12. Christian Heinrich Geyer von Geyersberg
6. Ludwig Heinrich Geyer von Geyersberg
13. Christiane Philippa von Thümmel
3. Baroness Caroline Louise Geyer of Geyersberg
14. Johann Rudolph Hedwiger, Count von Sponeck
7. Countess Maximiliana Christiane von Sponeck
15. Baroness Wilhelmine Louise von Hoff
