= Elisabeth zu Fürstenberg =

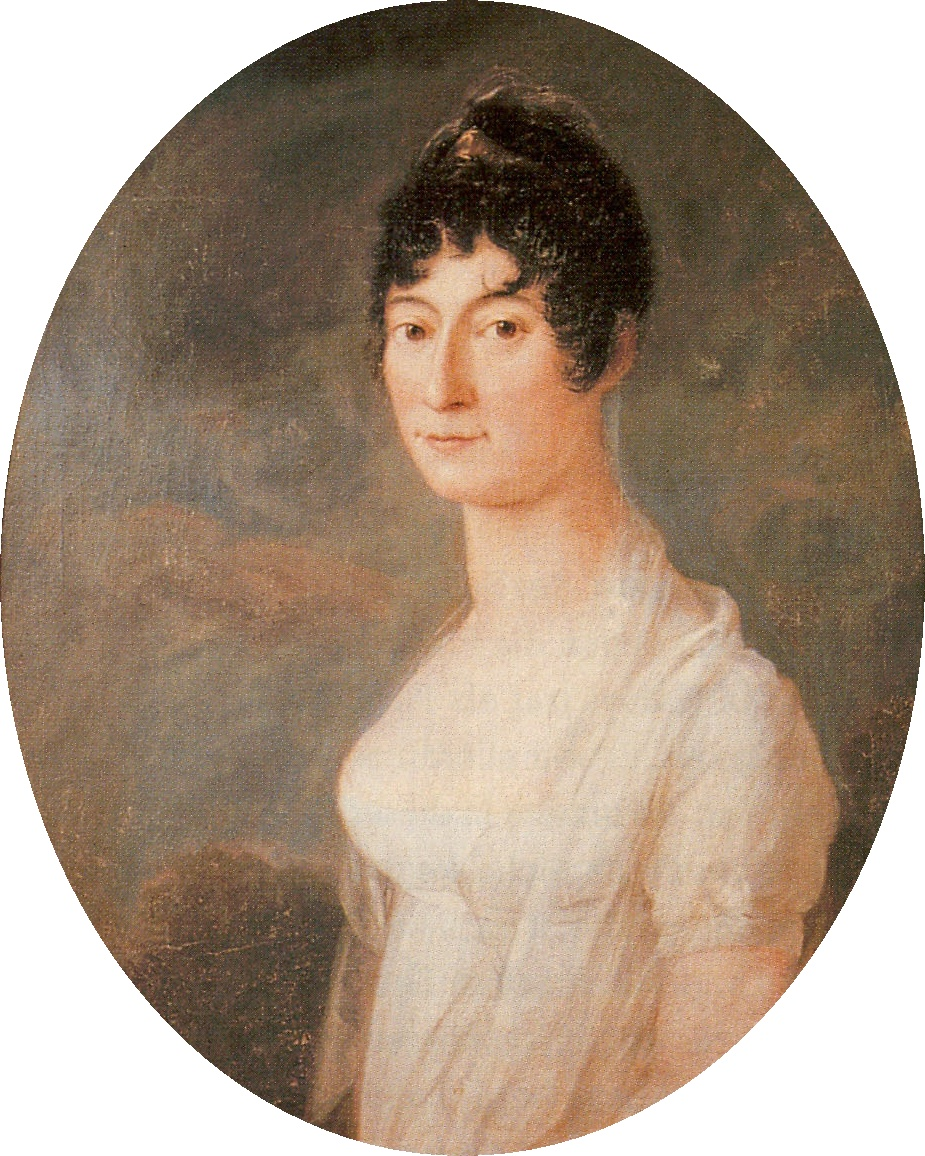
Princess Elisabeth of Thurn and Taxis, who married Karl Aloys in 1790.

Elisabeth zu Fürstenberg (1767–1822), regent of the Fürstenberg-Fürstenberg during the minority of her son, Charles Egon II, from 1804 until 1806.

== Biography ==
Born into the rich House of Thurn und Taxis, she was the daughter of Alexander Ferdinand, 3rd Prince of Thurn and Taxis and his third wife, Princess Maria Henriette Josepha of Fürstenberg-Stühlingen (1732–1772).

Elisabeth zu Fürstenberg was present at the Congress of Vienna where she as princess dowager was one of the most important spokespersons for the "mediatized" sovereigns. In Vienna, Elisabeth pressed for the return of the domains she had to relinquish to the Grand Duchy of Baden in 1806 by Napoleon.

== Personal life ==
On 4 November 1790, in Prague, she married her cousin, Prince Karl Aloys zu Fürstenberg. They had:

- Charles Egon II, Prince of Fürstenberg (1796–1854); married Princess Amalie of Baden and had issue
- Princess Marie Leopoldine of Fürstenberg (1791–1844); married Charles Albert III, Prince of Hohenlohe-Waldenburg-Schillingsfürst and had issue
- Princess Maria Josefa of Fürstenberg (d. 1792)
- Princess Antonie of Fürstenberg (1744–1799)
- Princess Maria Anna of Fürstenberg (1798–1799)
