= Hugo zu Hohenlohe-Öhringen =

Prince Hugo
- 4th Prince of Hohenlohe-Öhringen; 1st Duke of Ujest
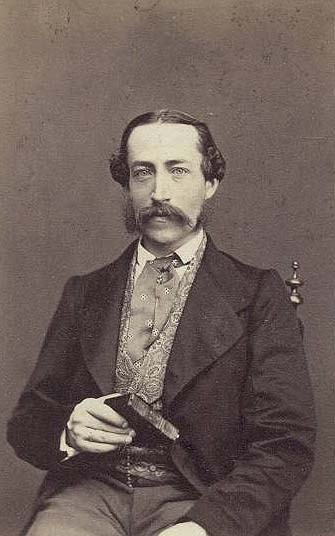
- Pictured in the 1870s
- Born: 27 May 1816; Stuttgart, Kingdom of Württemberg
- Died: 23 August 1897 (aged 81); Slawentzitz, Kingdom of Prussia, German Empire
- Spouse: Princess Pauline zu Fürstenberg (m. 1847)
- Issue: Hans zu Hohenlohe-Öhringen
- House: Hohenlohe-Öhringen
- Father: August, Prince of Hohenlohe-Öhringen
- Mother: Louise of Württemberg

Friedrich Wilhelm Eugen Karl Hugo, Prince of Hohenlohe-Öhringen, Duke of Ujest (title in German: Fürst zu Hohenlohe-Öhringen, Herzog von Ujest; 27 May 1816 – 23 August 1897) was a German nobleman, politician, mining industrialist and general in the armies of the kingdom of Württemberg and the kingdom of Prussia.

== Early life ==
A hereditary prince of the House of Hohenlohe, he was born in Stuttgart on 27 May 1816. He was the son of August, Prince of Hohenlohe-Öhringen.

His paternal grandparents were Frederick Louis, Prince of Hohenlohe-Ingelfingen, and Countess Maria Amalie von Hoym. His uncle was Prince Adolf zu Hohenlohe-Ingelfingen (who briefly served as Minister-President of Prussia in 1862 and was succeeded by Otto von Bismarck), and his cousin was Prince Kraft zu Hohenlohe-Ingelfingen.

== Career ==
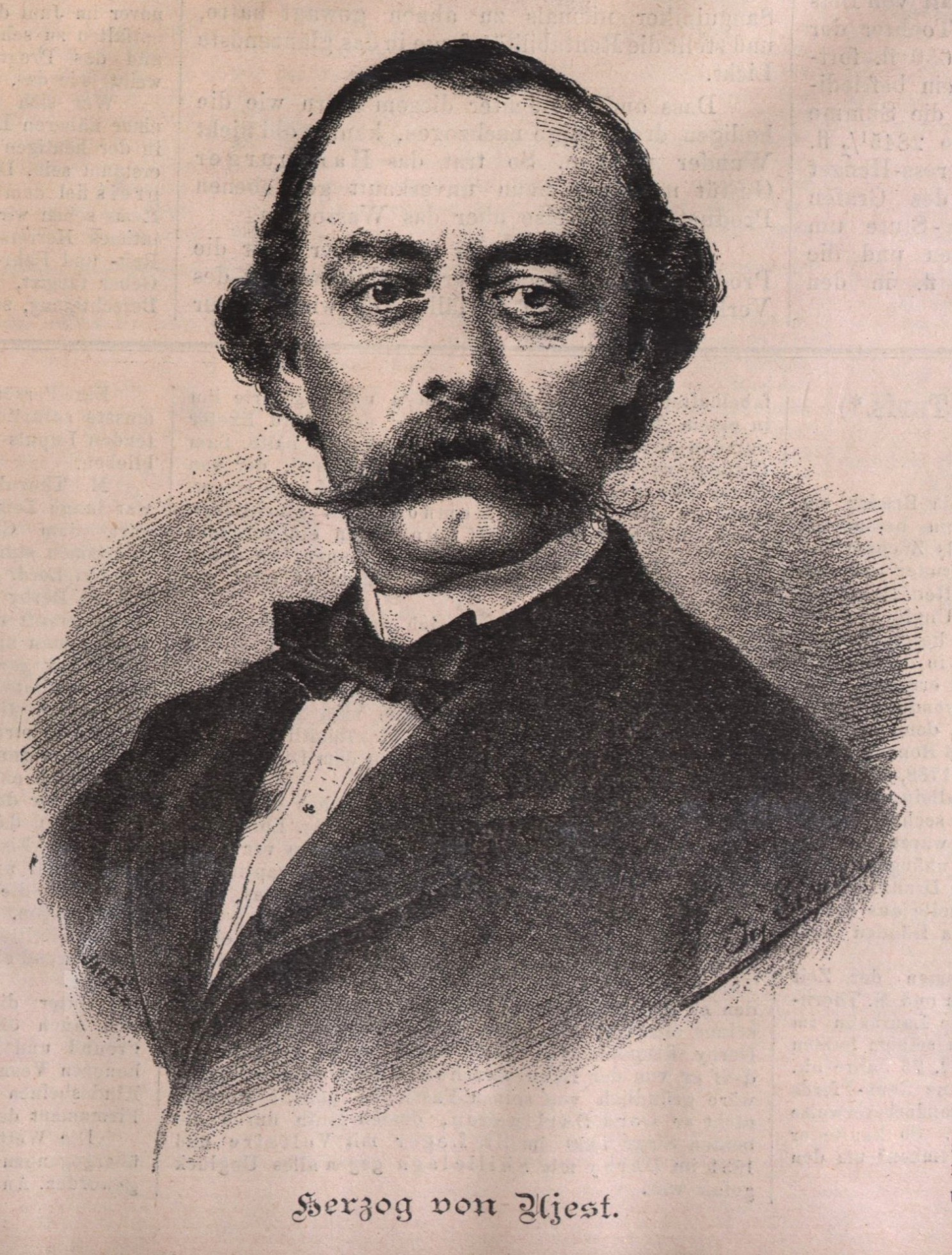
Portrait in 1878

His paternal grandfather, Frederick Louis, had acquired the estates of Slawentzitz, Ujest and Bitschin in Silesia by marriage in 1782, an area of 108 square miles. Prince Hugo inherited these lands, as well as his Franconian properties (Öhringen and Neuenstein), and established calamine mines. He also founded one of the largest zinc smelting plants in the world. The Prussian king, William I (later German Emperor), granted him the hereditary title of Herzog von Ujest (Duke of Ujest) upon the king's coronation in 1861.

== Personal life ==
On 15 April 1847, he married Princess Pauline Wilhelmine Karoline Amalie zu Fürstenberg (Donaueschingen, 11 June 1829 – Slawentzitz, 3 August 1900). She was the youngest child of Amalie of Baden and Charles Egon II, Prince of Fürstenberg.

Together, they were the parents of:

- Christian Kraft Herzog zu Hohenlohe-Öhringen (Öhringen, 21 March 1848 – Somogyszob, 14 May 1926), who married Otilie Lubraniec-Dąmbski (1868–1922).
- Marie Filicitas Maria zu Hohenlohe-Öhringen (Schaffhausen, 25 July 1849 – Meffersdorf in Wigandsthal, 31 January 1929), who married Heinrich XIX, Prince Reuss of Köstritz (1848–1904).
- Luise zu Hohenlohe-Öhringen (Slawentzitz, 14 July 1851 – Slawentzitz, 18 February 1920), who married Friedrich Ludwig Count von Frankenberg und Ludwigsdorff (1835–1897).
- August Karl August zu Hohenlohe-Öhringen (Slawentzitz, 2 January 1854 – San Remo, 27 January 1884), who died unmarried.
- Friedrich Karl zu Hohenlohe-Öhringen (Slawentzitz, 21 September 1855 – Paris, 27 December 1910), who married Countess Marie von Hatzfeldt (1871–1932), a daughter of Count Paul von Hatzfeldt.
- Hans Heinrich Georg zu Hohenlohe-Öhringen (Slawentzitz, 24 April 1858 – Oppurg, 24 April 1945), who married Princess Gertrud Auguste Mathilde Olga von Hohenlohe-Öhringen (1862–1935).
- Max Anthon Karl zu Hohenlohe-Öhringen (Slawentzitz, 2 March 1860 – Berlin, 14 January 1922), who married Countess Helene "Nelly" von Hatzfeldt (1865–1901), a daughter of Count Paul von Hatzfeldt.
- Hugo Friedrich zu Hohenlohe-Öhringen (Slawentzitz, 26 September 1864 – Berlin, 31 October 1928), who married Helga Hager (1877–1951).
- Margaret zu Hohenlohe-Öhringen (Slawentzitz, 27 December 1865 – Dresden, 13 June 1940), who married William of Hohenzollern, Count of Hohenau (1854–1930), son of Prince Albert of Prussia.

Hugo died at Sławięcice Palace (Schloss Slawentzitz) on 23 August 1897.

== Honours ==
- Kingdom of Prussia:
  - Knight of Honour of the Johanniter Order, 18 January 1850
  - Knight of the Prussian Crown, 1st Class, 19 January 1862; with Enamel Band of the Red Eagle, 1865
  - Grand Cross of the Red Eagle, 16 January 1866; with Collar, 1882
  - Iron Cross (1870), 2nd Class on White Band with Black Edge
  - Grand Commander's Cross of the Royal House Order of Hohenzollern, 20 September 1866
  - Knight of the Black Eagle, with Collar, 21 January 1887
- Hohenzollern: Cross of Honour of the Princely House Order of Hohenzollern, 1st Class
- Electorate of Hesse:
  - Knight of the Golden Lion, 12 June 1851
  - Grand Cross of the Wilhelmsorden
- Baden:
  - Knight of the House Order of Fidelity, 1847
  - Grand Cross of the Zähringer Lion, 1847
- (Saxe-Coburg and Gotha) (Duchy of Saxe-Altenburg) (Saxe-Meiningen) Ernestine duchies: Grand Cross of the Saxe-Ernestine House Order, 1860
- Grand Duchy of Hesse: Military Medical Cross, 12 August 1871
- Russian Empire: Knight of St. Anna, 2nd Class
- Saxe-Weimar-Eisenach: Grand Cross of the White Falcon, 1892
- Württemberg:
  - Grand Cross of the Friedrich Order, 1846
  - Grand Cross of the Württemberg Crown, 1864
  - Knight of the Order of Olga, 1872

== Gallery ==
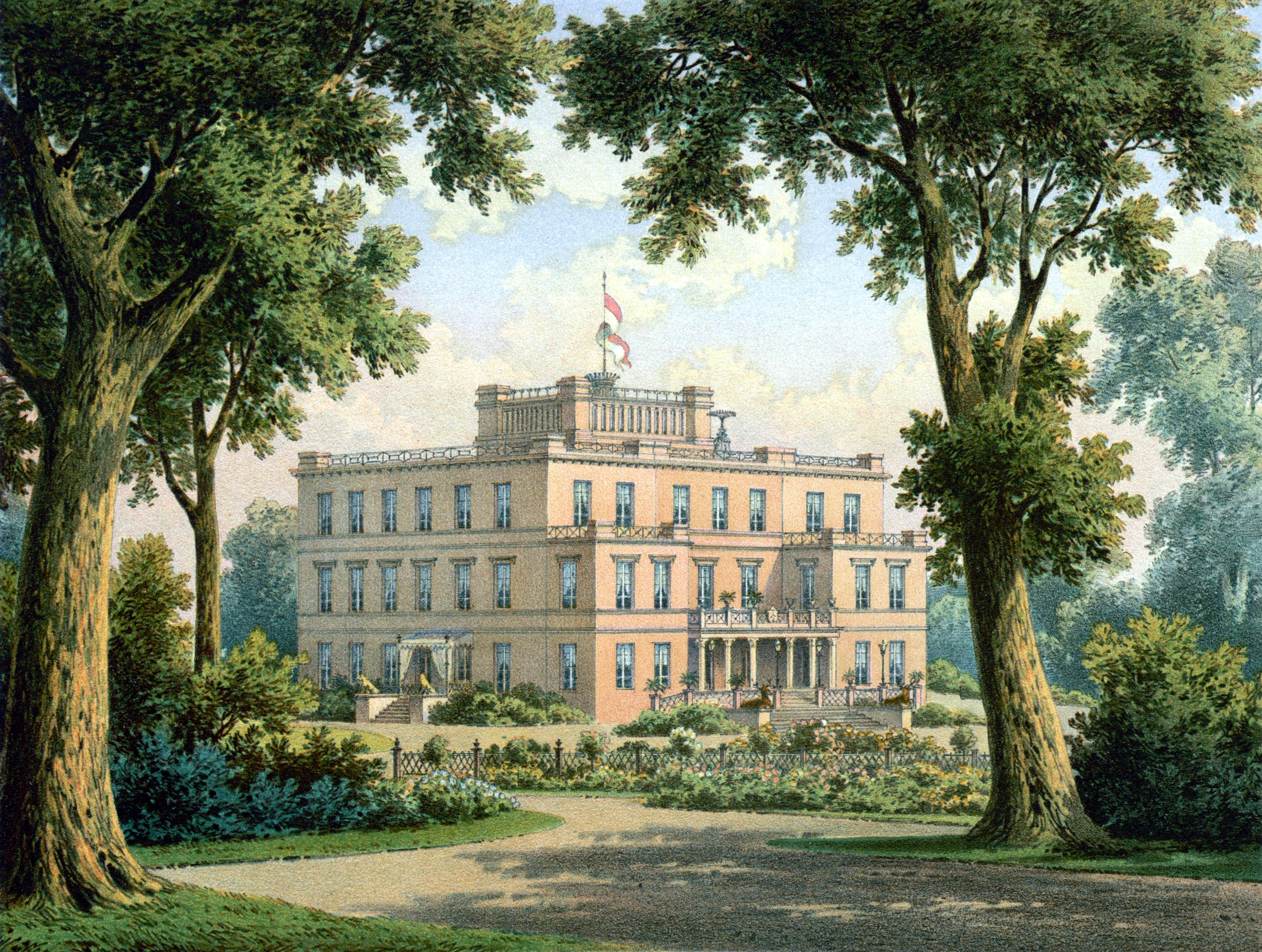
Slawentzitz

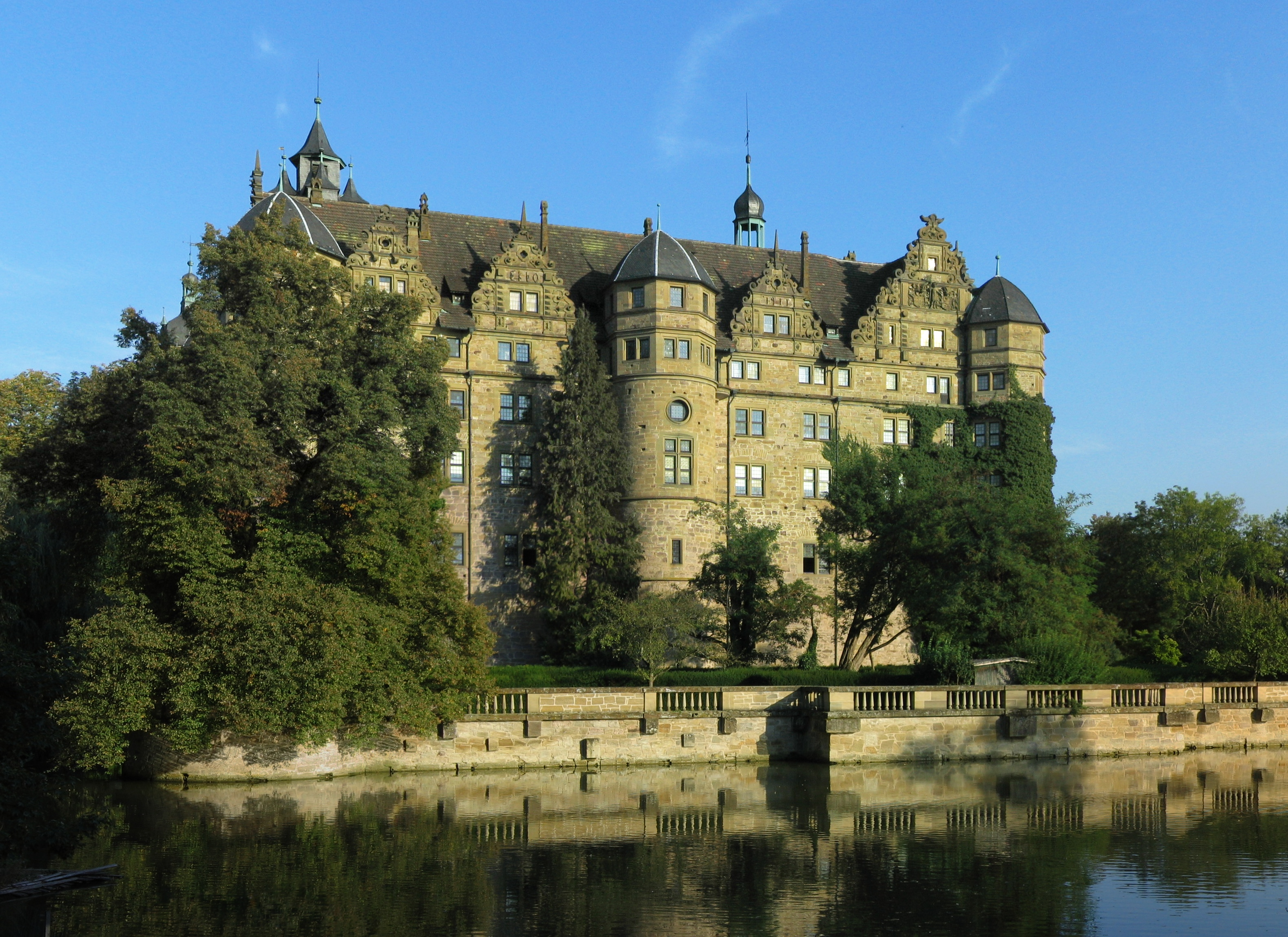
Neuenstein

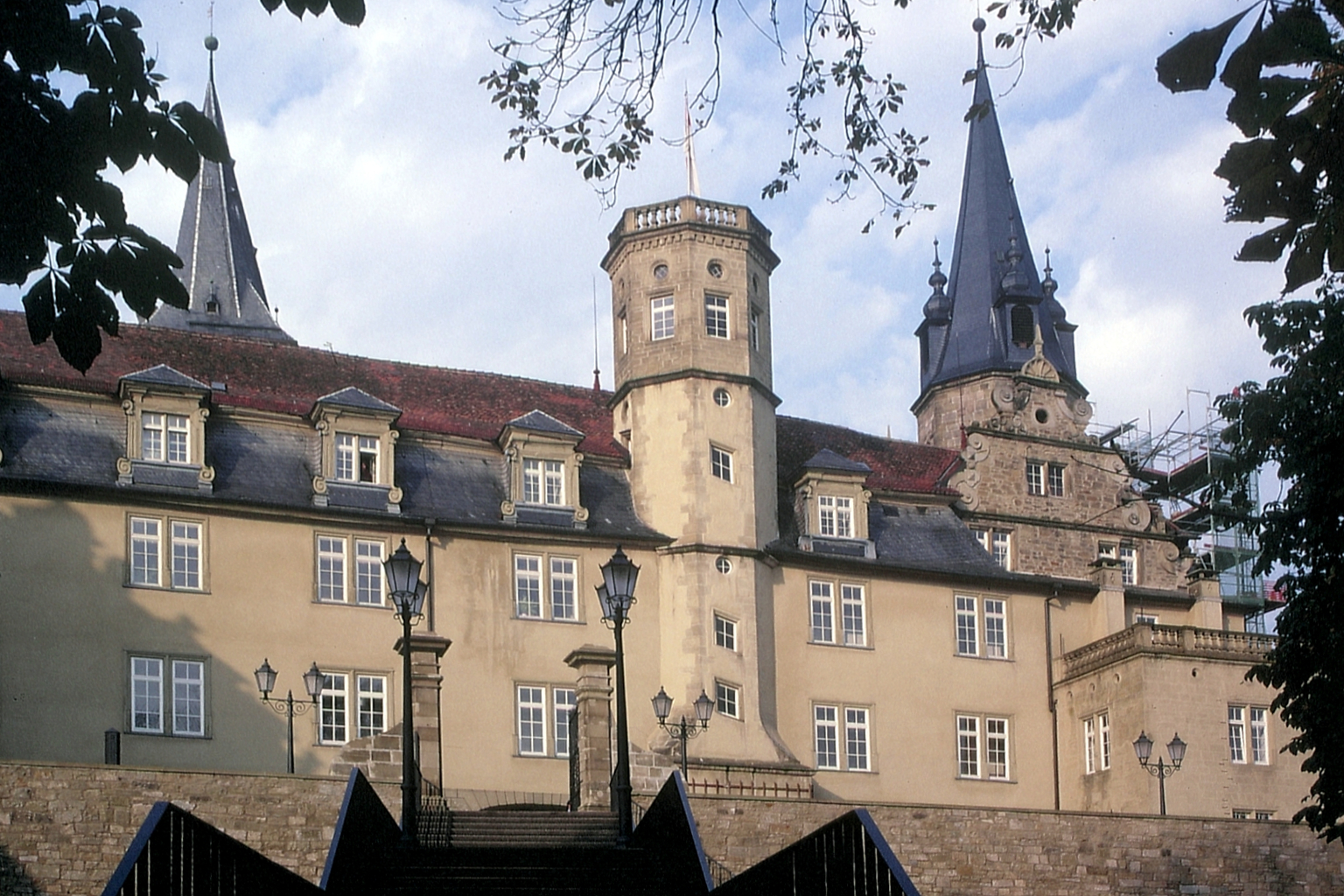
Öhringen

== Ancestry ==
Ancestors of Hugo zu Hohenlohe-Öhringen

8. Heinrich August, Prince of Hohenlohe-Ingelfingen
4. Friedrich Ludwig, Prince of Hohenlohe-Ingelfingen
9. Countess Wilhelmine Eleonore of Hohenlohe-Öhringen
2. August, 3rd Prince of Hohenlohe-Öhringen
10. Count Julius Gebhard of Hoym
5. Countess Amalie of Hoym
11. Christiane Charlotte of Dieskau
1. Hugo, 4th Prince of Hohenlohe-Öhringen, 1st Duke of Ujest
12. Frederick II Eugene, Duke of Württemberg
6. Duke Eugen of Württemberg
13. Margravine Sophia Dorothea of Brandenburg-Schwedt
3. Duchess Louise of Württemberg
14. Christian Karl, Prince of Stolberg-Gedern
7. Princess Louise of Stolberg-Gedern
15. Countess Eleonore of Reuss-Lobenstein

Hugo, 4th Prince of Hohenlohe-Öhringen, 1st Duke of Ujest House of Hohenlohe-Öhringen Cadet branch of the House of Hohenlohe Born: 27 May 1816 Died: 23 August 1897
German nobility
Preceded by August, 3rd Prince of Hohenlohe-Öhringen	Prince of Hohenlohe-Öhringen; 1 January 1849 – 23 August 1897	Succeeded by Christian, 5th Prince of Hohenlohe-Öhringen, 2nd Duke of Ujest
New title	Duke of Ujest; 18 October 1861 – 23 August 1897	Succeeded by Christian, 5th Prince of Hohenlohe-Öhringen, 2nd Duke of Ujest
