= Louise Caroline of Hochberg =

German noblewoman

Louise Caroline von Hochberg
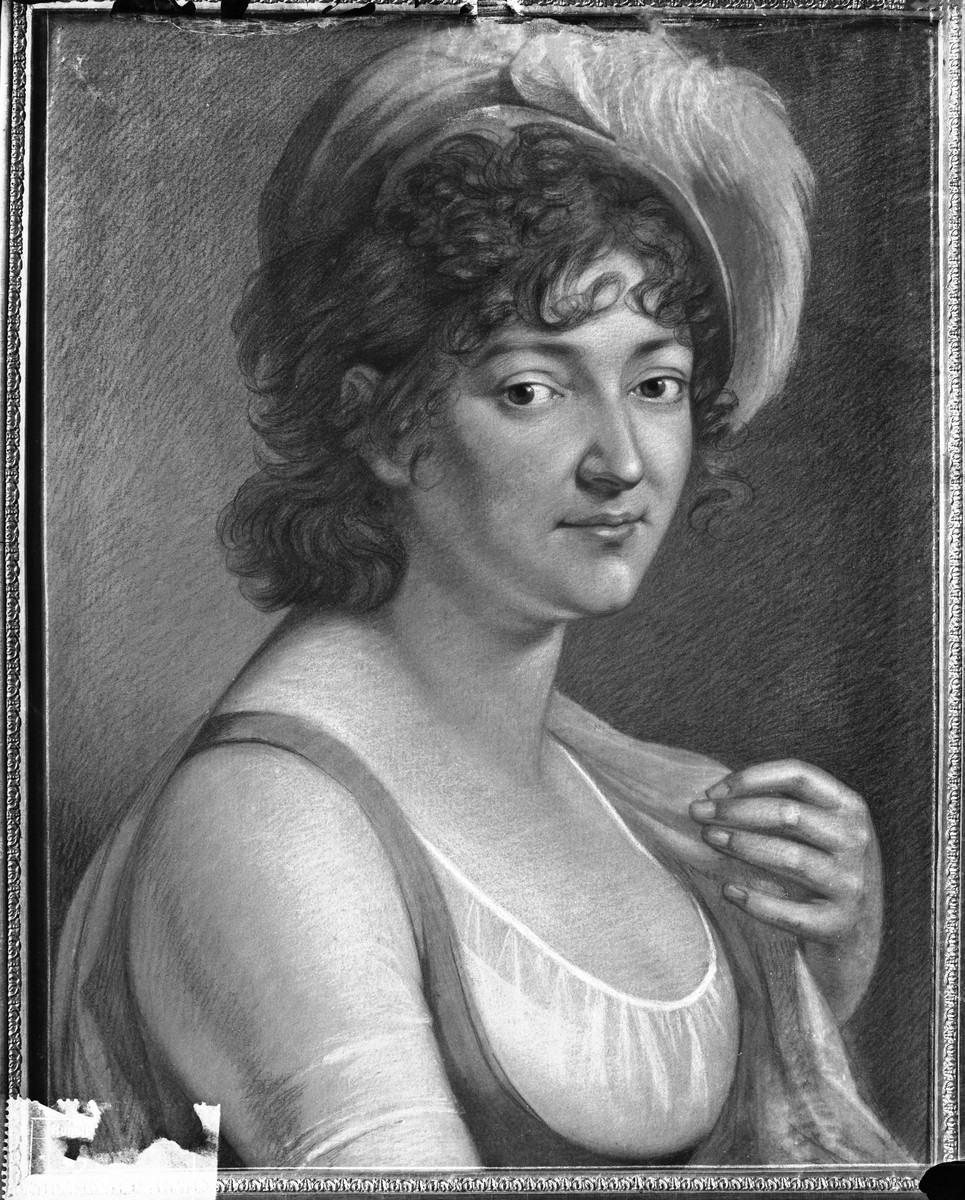
- Portrait of Louise Caroline (c. 1800)
- Born: 26 May 1768; Karlsruhe, Margraviate of Baden-Durlach
- Died: 23 June 1820 (aged 52); Karlsruhe, Grand Duchy of Baden
- Noble family: Geyer von Geyersberg
- Spouse: Charles Frederick, Grand Duke of Baden (m. 1787; died 1811)
- Issue: Leopold, Grand Duke of Baden; Prince William; Prince Frederick Alexander; Princess Amalie; Prince Maximilian
- Father: Louis Henry Philipp Geyer von Geyersberg
- Mother: Maximiliana von Sponeck

Countess Louise Caroline von Hochberg, born Geyer von Geyersberg (26 May 1768 in Karlsruhe – 23 June 1820, Karlsruhe), from 1787 Baroness von Hochberg, from 1796 Countess of Hochberg, was the second wife of the Margrave, Elector and later Grand Duke Charles Frederick of Baden. Her descendants eventually ascended the grand ducal throne and reigned until 1918.

== Origin ==
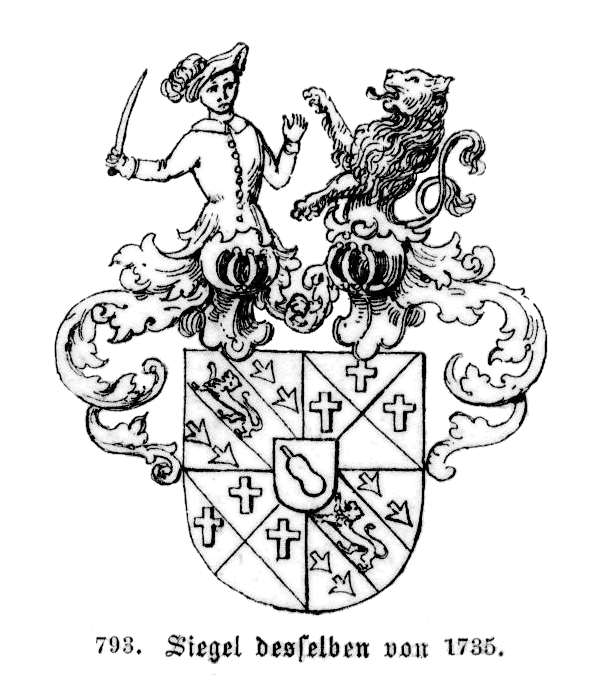
Coat of Arms of Geyer von Geyersberg family (1735)

Louise Caroline Geyer von Geyersberg was the daughter of Lieutenant Colonel Ludwig Heinrich Philip Geyer von Geyersberg (1729-1772) and his wife, Countess Maximiliana Hedwiger von Sponeck (1730-1804). The latter was the niece-in-law of Leopold Eberhard, Duke of Württemberg-Montbéliard.

Louise Caroline descends from a Lower Austrian Geiger family. Her ancestor, Walther Geiger, a postal administrator in Vienna, being ennobled in the Holy Roman Empire, along with some collateral relatives, in 1595. In 1625 Emperor Ferdinand II authorized them to add the noble suffix von Geyersberg.

Sometime after 1675 Louise Caroline's great-grandfather, Christoph Ferdinand (d. 1708), substituted a more noble version of the family name, Geyer von Geyersberg.

While in the service of Eberhard Louis, Duke of Württemberg his son, Christian Heinrich, self-assumed the title of Baron in 1729, having married Philippine Christiane von Thummel (1710-1751) the previous year, in 1728.

Nonetheless, prior to Louise Caroline's marriage, written references to her at the court of Baden omit any baronial title.

Louise Caroline attended a private school in Colmar. Later she attended the court of Baden-Durlach as a lady in waiting to the Hereditary Princess Amalie, where she met her future husband, Hereditary Prince Charles Frederick.

== Marriage to Margrave Charles Frederick ==
Although referred to at the wedding on 24 November 1787 by the title "Baroness Geyer von Geyersberg" by her fiance, her marriage to the Margrave Charles Frederick, who had been widowed since 1783, was at the time deemed morganatic because she was regarded as of unequal rank to the prince.

Following the wedding, the Margrave declared that his wife would bear the title of Baroness von Hochberg. In the same proclamation, co-signed by the three sons of his first marriage, he reserved decision on the title and succession rights of sons to be born of the marriage.

In July 1799 letters patent were issued by the Holy Roman Emperor Francis II, of retroactive effect to 12 May 1796, elevating her to the Imperial title Countess of Hochberg. She never obtained the rank of an Imperial princess, nor that of Margravine, the title borne by Charles Frederick's first wife.

== Sons' inheritance ==
Although Louise Caroline's children were not initially legally recognised as of dynastic rank, on 20 February 1796 their father clarified in writing (subsequently co-signed by his elder sons) that the couple's sons were eligible to succeed to the margravial throne in order of male primogeniture after extinction of the male issue of his first marriage, who were by then the only remaining dynasts of the House of Baden. The Margrave further declared that his marriage to their mother must "in no way be seen as morganatic, but rather as a true equal marriage", although the daughters remained baronesses and the sons were only assigned the title Count von Hochberg at that time. But in 1799 Louise's sons were granted the title of Imperial Counts von Hochberg (retroactive to 1796).

On 10 September 1806, after the abolition of the Holy Roman Empire and assumption of the fully sovereign title Grand Duke of Baden, Charles Frederick confirmed the dynastic status of the sons of his second marriage. This act was, yet again, signed by all other males of the House of Baden (i.e., his three eldest sons), but was not promulgated.

Charles Frederick died in 1811 and was succeeded (his eldest son being already deceased) by his grandson, Charles, Grand Duke of Baden. On 4 October 1817, as neither he nor the other sons from his grandfather's first marriage had surviving male descendants, Charles confirmed the succession rights of his half-uncles, granting each the title, Prince and Margrave of Baden, and the style of Highness. He asked the princely congress in Aachen on 20 November 1818, just weeks before his death, to confirm the succession rights of the sons of Louise Caroline.

But this proclamation of Baden's succession evoked international challenges. The Congress of Vienna had, in 1815, recognised the eventual claims of Austria and Bavaria to parts of Baden which it allocated to Charles Frederick in the Upper Palatinate and the Breisgau, anticipating that upon his imminent demise those lands would cease to be part of the Grand Duchy. The disputes were resolved by the Treaty of Frankfurt, 1819, under which Baden ceded a portion of Wertheim, already enclaved within Bavaria, to that Kingdom, whereupon the succession as settled in 1817 was recognized by Bavaria and Austria.

In 1830, ten years after Louise Caroline's death, following the death of Louis I (who was the last ruler of the old line), her son Leopold finally ascended the throne as Grand Duke. Louise's descendants ruled the Grand Duchy of Baden until its abolition in 1918. The current pretenders are descendants of Louise Caroline.

== Kaspar Hauser ==
It was alleged that Louise Caroline conspired to substitute a dead infant for the first-born son of Grand Duke Charles and Grand Duchess Stephanie, in order to secure the throne for her own sons. When Kaspar Hauser was found, rumour had it that he was this first-born prince of Baden, allegedly spirited away at birth and raised without knowledge of his royal ancestry. Modern historians consider this legend as refuted.

== Offspring ==
By her marriage to Charles Frederick she had the following children:

- Leopold (29 August 1790 – 24 April 1852)
- William (8 April 1792 – 11 October 1859)
- Frederick Alexander (10 June 1793 – 18 June 1793)
- Amalie (26 January 1795 – 14 September 1869), married on 19 April 1818 Charles Egon II, Prince of Fürstenberg (28 October 1796 – 22 October 1854)
- Maximilian (8 December 1796 – 6 March 1882).

== References and notes ==
- Entry in the Deutsche Biographische Enzyklopädie
