= Donaubach =

River in Germany

Location
- Country: Germany
- State: Baden-Württemberg

Physical characteristics
- Source
  - location: Source of the Danube
  - coordinates: 47.9518°N 8.5025°E
- Mouth
  - location: Brigach
  - coordinates: 47.9509°N 8.5024°E

Basin features
- Progression: Brigach→ Danube→ Black Sea

Donaubach is a river in Donaueschingen, Baden-Württemberg, Germany. It flows from the source of the Danube to the Brigach. For much of modern history, it has been considered the source of the Danube river.

== See also ==
- List of rivers of Baden-Württemberg
- River Breg
