= Sources of the Danube =

River source

Coordinates: 48.0951°N 8.1549°E

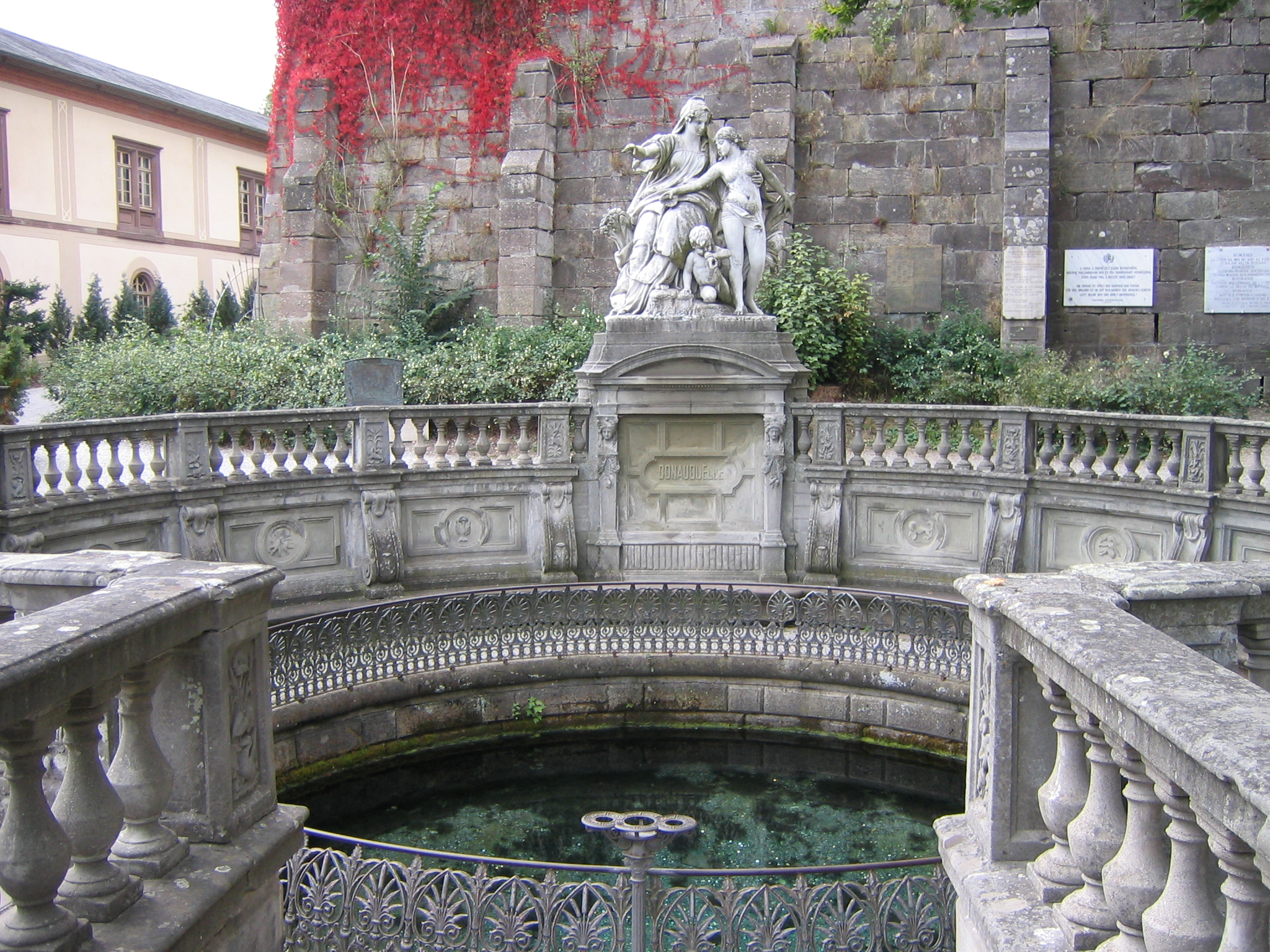
Donauquelle in Donaueschingen

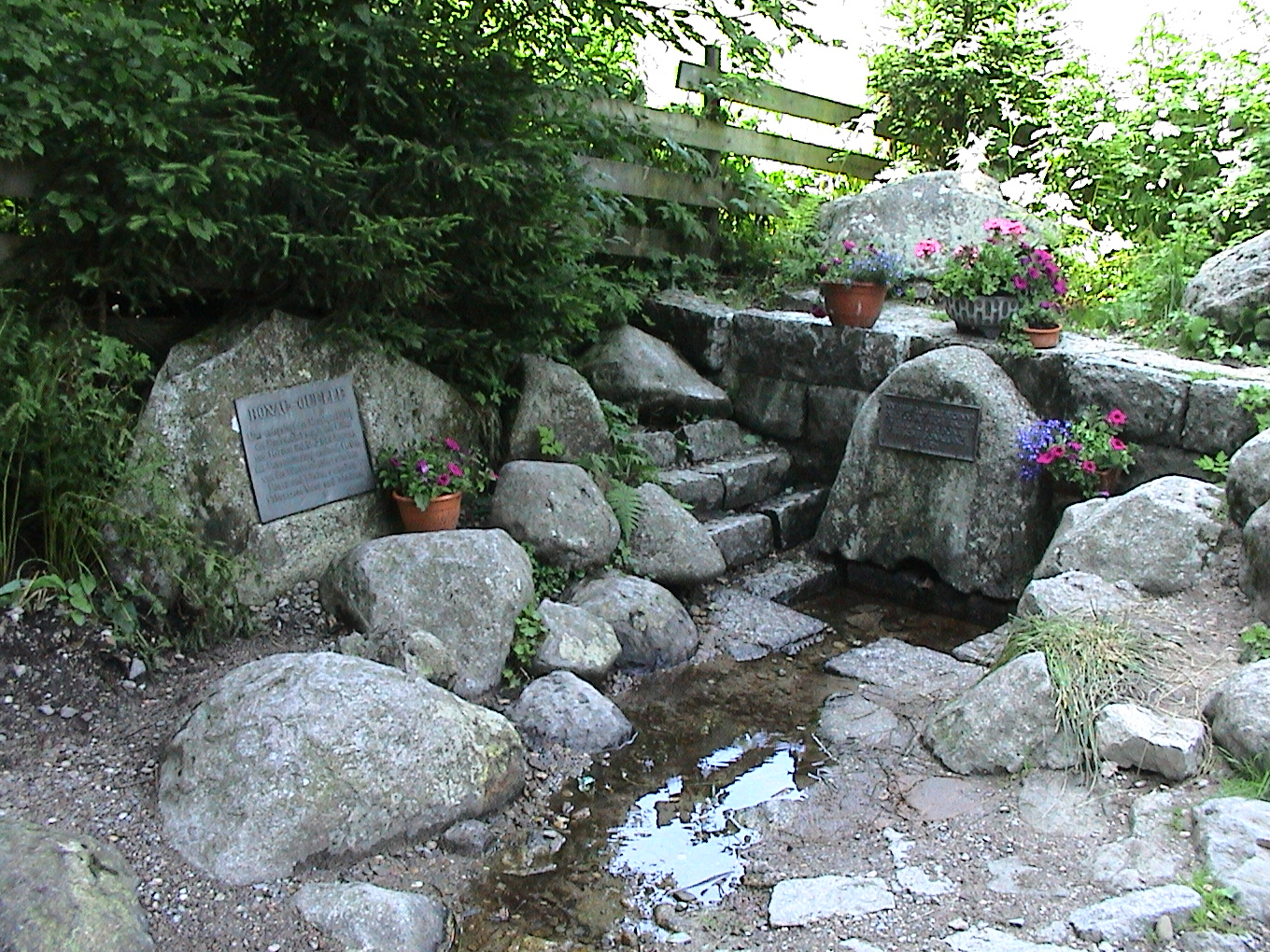
Donauquelle near Furtwangen

The Danube is conventionally taken to be formed by the confluence of the two streams Brigach and Breg just east of Donaueschingen. The source of the Donaubach, which flows into the Danube, in the park of Donaueschingen Palace is often referred to as the source of the Danube (Donauquelle). Hydrologically, the source of the Danube is the source of the Breg as the larger of the two formative streams (with its spring at a higher altitude and – at the confluence – not only being 5 km longer but also having a higher amount of water discharge) which rises near Furtwangen.

There was an active rivalry between the municipalities of Furtwangen and Donaueschingen for the claim of being home to the "official" source of the Danube since the 1950s, sometimes with the involvement of the government of the state of Baden-Württemberg. Thus, in 1981 the state government granted Donaueschingen the request that the source in Furtwangen should no longer be labelled Donauquelle in official maps.

== Meaning of the Danube ==
The waters of rivers collect in a barely comprehensible number of headwaters, which gradually merge. The numerous merger points of each greater upstream river build the backbone of this type of drainage system and with that the source of the entire river. The main point or backbone of a river is sometimes defined by further features such as length, drainage area or steady flow direction. For a long time, unique springs which differed in size or the starting point of a certain headwater were also of mythical significance. This is reflected in sacred springs and water sanctuaries, and in the worship of Naiads. The source of the mightiest river in the Roman Empire was no exception. The Danube river, emanating from the Abnoba mountains, was considered to be a river or spring goddess. In contrast to the more mythical role, the hydrological significance of the source of the Danube is notably small; this is because a significant portion of the Danube's headwater is channelled into the Rhine, both above and below Tuttlingen (see also Danube Sinkhole). Consequently, it dries up for most of the year. Near Ulm, in terms of hydrology, the more water-rich Iller flows into the Danube as one of its tributaries.

== Sources of the Danube ==
=== Donaubach spring ===
The Donaubach rises on the castle grounds near the left corner of the front face of the castle Donaueschingen in a karst spring. This karst spring has an embankment of 15 to 70 L/s and enters into the Brigach after flowing 90 meters belowground. The Brigach and the Breg become the Danube after 1.5 km. The source is one of 22 sources in the area of the junction of Brigach and Berg. All of these sources are fed by both water which trickles away above them and rainfall which trickles away on the karstified downs of a landscape called Baar. Together, the Brigach and the Breg empty out between 400 and 1000 L/s.

The Donaubach spring was considered the source of the Danube since the 15th century at least (Hartmann Schedel in his Weltchronik from 1493), but several hints suggest that this might have been true even in Roman times (Pliny the Elder in Naturalis Historia), in which the river was located in the fringes of the populated areas. The oldest cartographic depiction by Sebastian Münster from 1538 shows the Donaubach spring as a rectangular pool; in 1875, the spring was modelled into a round pool after Adolf Weinbrenner's design. In 1895 the artist Adolf Heer created a group of statues above the pool, depicting "the mother Baar" showing her "daughter", the young Danube, the way. The supposed source of the Danube is a popular tourist attraction.

Similar springs on tributary rivers include the Neckar spring, the Enzbrunnen, the Pegnitz spring and the Berkel spring.

=== Origin of the Breg ===
The spring of the river Breg is situated in the north of Furtwangen next to St. Martin's Church. The Breg is longer and has a greater water flow than the Brigach, and its spring is therefore considered the main origin of the upper Danube. The dominance of the Breg is established by the following data:

	Water flow	Drainage basin	Length	Spring height
Brigach	3.37 m^{3}/s	195 km^{2}	40.2 km	940 m
Breg	5.95 m^{3}/s	291.2 km^{2}	45.9 km	1078 m

As early as 1847 the following definition can already be found in the Universallexikon des Großherzogtums Baden (Universal Lexicon of the Grand Duchy of Baden): "Danube, the biggest river of Germany, rises at the Martinskapelle in a wild and lonely area of the Black Forest, is called Brege at its origin and forms the river Danube in Donaueschingen where it is unified with the Brigach." (German original: "Donau, der größte Fluß Deutschlands, entspringt bei der Martinskapelle in einer wilden und einsamen Gegend des Schwarzwaldes, heißt am Anfang Brege... und bildet erst in Donaueschingen, wo sie sich mit der Brigach vereinigt, die Donau.")

The identification of the main spring in the uppermost Bregtal (also called Katzensteig) is dependent on a defining convention: Instead of localizing the main spring in Gewann Briglirain (also called Brücklerain) it is, because of length and drainage measurements from the 1950s, localized at the Martinskapelle in Gewann today. This part of the river carries more water and has a bigger drainage but partly trickles away, especially in dry weather conditions, into the rubble at the bottom of the valley. This is no concern for the choice of this part of the river but for the height of the spring as a perennial outflow.

=== Further Sources of the Danube ===
- The source of Juniperus (German: Juniperusquelle), which is located in the city district Allmendshofen in Donaueschingen, has been called the source of the Danube as well.
- In 1719, Vikar Breuninger declared the source of Brigach, which flows into the Danube, as the source of the Danube at the convent of St. Georgen. During some renovation works in 1888/89 at the "Hirzbauernhof (farm)", a sandstone relief, presumptively of Celtic origin at around 100 A.D., was found. The relief depicts animals and heads, which can be interpreted as symbols for Gods. Today, a copy of it can be found at the source of the Danube and is often considered as a sainthood of the Source. Another assumption is that this stone was brought from the region of Western Baar to the "Hirzbauernhof (farm)" because of the way it is shaped (like a deer: in German Hirsch/Hirz).
- Because of its high location, the Swiss natural scientist Schleuchzer declared the source of the Inn as the source of the Danube. In a hydrological aspect, the Inn in combination with the Flaz can be indeed considered as part of the Danube main strand, although it might be due to the slightly higher average water flow.

=== Confluence of Brigach and Breg ===
The river Danube properly begins with the confluence of the two headwater streams Brigach and Breg in the region of Donaueschingen. The river flows on from there into the delta of the Black Sea, after 2811 km.

== Research and political importance ==
In 1949 Franz Burgert from Furtwangen argued for the spring near St. Martin's Church being the origin of the Breg, instead of the spring near Briglirain. This was also underpinned in the 1950s by the investigations of geologist Irma Öhrlein, which were later meticulously continued by Ludwig Öhrlein. The question of what is the spring of the Danube also interested the oceanographer Jacques Cousteau, who in 1987 filmed a documentary about the Danube around St. Martin's Church.

For centuries, the two cities Furtwangen and Donaueschingen competed for an official status which declares their own source as the official source of the Danube. The city Furtwangen is located along the upper river Breg, while the city Donaueschingen is located at the symbolic source of the Danube. At times, the issue even involves the government of Baden-Württemberg. After the city council Donaueschingen intervened in 1981, for example, the Ministry of the Interior in Stuttgart announced that "the source of the Breg is not anymore displayed as the source of the Danube on ministerial maps. The land surveying office was instructed to act accordingly." However, the former minister for agriculture and forestry confirmed in a document addressed to Prof. Öhrlein in 1982: "Getting back to the issue regarding the source of the Danube, I can once again confirm that the so-called source of the Danube in Donaueschingen is certainly not the real source of the river Danube, if analysed with geographical and hydrological criteria. The river Breg can rightly be called the main stream of the Danube."
