= Karl Aloys zu Fürstenberg =

Habsburg military commander (1760–1799)

Karl Aloys zu Fürstenberg-Stühlingen
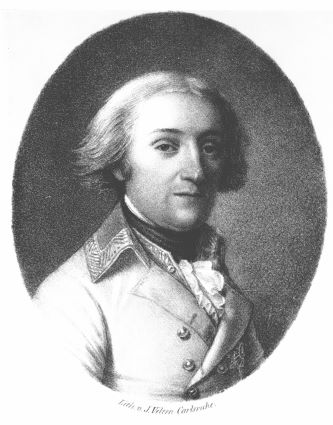
- Born: 26 June 1760; Prague
- Died: 25 March 1799 (aged 38); Stockach, present day Baden-Württemberg, Germany
- Burial place: Family grave at family cemetery, Maria Hof (Neudingen) near Donaueschingen (re-interred 1857)
- Relatives: Alexander Ferdinand, 3rd Prince of Thurn and Taxis (father in law)
- Military career
- Allegiance: Habsburg monarchy
- Branch: Colonel and Proprietor, 36th Infantry Regiment
- Service years: 1777–1799
- Rank: Feldmarschallleutnant
- Conflicts: War of the Bavarian Succession; Austro-Turkish War (1788–1791); War of the First Coalition; Siege of Hüningen (1796–1797); War of the Second Coalition; Battle of Ostrach; Battle of Stockach †
- Awards: Military Order of St. Hubert 1791

Karl Aloys zu Fürstenberg (26 June 1760 – 25 March 1799) was an Austrian military commander. He achieved the rank of Feldmarschallleutnant and died at the Battle of Stockach.

A younger member of a cadet branch of the House of Fürstenberg, at his birth his chances of inheriting the family title of Fürst zu Fürstenberg were slight; he was prepared instead for a military career, and a tutor was hired to teach him the military sciences. He entered the Habsburg military in 1777, at the age of seventeen years, and was a member of the field army in the short War of the Bavarian Succession (1778–79). His career progressed steadily during the Habsburg War with the Ottoman Empire. In particular he distinguished himself at Šabac in 1790, when he led his troops in storming the fortress on the Sava river.

During the French Revolutionary Wars, he fought with distinction again for the First Coalition, particularly at Ketsch and Frœschwiller, and in 1796 at Emmendingen, Schliengen and Kehl. He was stationed at key points to protect the movements of the Austrian army. With a force of 10,000, he defended the German Rhineland at Kehl, and reversed a bayonet assault by French troops at Bellheim; his troops also overran Speyer without any losses. By the end of the War of the First Coalition, at the age of 35, he had achieved the rank of Feldmarschallleutnant. During the War of the Second Coalition, he fought in the first two battles of the German campaign, at Ostrach on 21 March 1799, and at Stockach on 25 March 1799. At the latter action while leading a grenadier regiment, he was hit by French case shot and knocked off his horse. He died shortly afterward.

== Childhood and early military training ==
Karl Aloys was a son of Karl Egon, second son of Joseph Wilhelm Ernst, first Prince of Fürstenberg. His tutor, Lieutenant Ernst, was in active service in the Habsburg military, and took six-year-old Karl Aloys on maneuvers with him. In this way, he learned as a child the Habsburg military manual, and came into contact with important military men who later furthered his education and career; he also acquired an honorary rank as Kreis-Obristen, or Colonel of the Imperial Circle, by the time he was ten years old. As a youth, in 1776, he met the Habsburg war minister Count Franz Moritz von Lacy and Baron Ernst Gideon von Laudon; he was also invited to dine with Emperor Joseph II. He started his service in 1777 as a Fähnrich (ensign) in the Habsburg military organization. He saw his first field service during the War of the Bavarian Succession (1777–78), although he was not involved in any battles.

In 1780, at the age of twenty years, he was promoted to captain, and assigned to the 34th Infantry Regiment, also known as the Anton Esterházy, named for Paul II Anton, Prince Esterházy, the general of cavalry, field marshal of the Seven Years' War, and ambassador to Britain. While he was assigned to this unit, he participated in the border conflicts between the Ottoman Empire and the Habsburgs, 1787–92, and stormed the fortress at Šabac (German: Schabatz) on the Sava River in Serbia on 27 April 1788. For his action at Šabac, he was personally commended by the Emperor; on the following day, he was promoted to major and given command of a grenadier battalion.

On 1 January 1790, at Laudon's explicit request, Karl Aloys zu Fürstenberg was promoted to major general; at the end of June of that year, he received the coveted position of second colonel of the 34th Infantry Regiment Anton Esterhazy, where he served as the executive officer for Anton I, Prince Esterházy, the 34th Hungarian Regiment's Colonel and Proprietor. This was a customary appointment in which a less prominent officer completed the day-to-day administrative duties of the Colonel and Proprietor, who was usually a noble and was often posted in a different assignment, sometimes a different staff location. Karl Aloys zu Fürstenberg also received the confraternal Order of Saint Hubert from the Duke of Bavaria and married the "elegant" Princess Elisabeth of Thurn und Taxis (1767–1822), that year.

== Fight against Revolutionary France ==
While Karl Aloys zu Fürstenberg fought for the Habsburg cause in Serbia, in France, a coalition of the clergy and the professional and bourgeois class—the First and Third estates—led a call for reform of the French government and the creation of a written constitution. Initially, the rulers of Europe viewed the French Revolution as an event between the French king and his subjects, and not something in which they should interfere. In 1790, Leopold succeeded his brother Joseph as emperor and by 1791, he considered the situation surrounding his sister, Marie Antoinette, and her children, with greater alarm. In August 1791, in consultation with French émigré nobles and Frederick William II of Prussia, he issued the Declaration of Pillnitz, in which they declared the interest of the monarchs of Europe as one with the interests of Louis XVI and his family. They threatened ambiguous, but quite serious, consequences if anything should happen to the royal family. The French émigrés continued to agitate for support of a counter-revolution. On 20 April 1792, the French National Convention declared war on Austria. In the War of the First Coalition (1792–1797), France opposed most of the European states sharing land or water borders with her, plus Portugal and the Ottoman Empire.

Promotions

- Fähnrich (Ensign): 1777
- Hauptmann (Captain): 1780
- Major: 1788
- Oberstleutnant (Lieutenant Colonel): 1788
- Oberst(Colonel): 2 November 1789
- Generalmajor (Major General): 1 January 1790 (effective 12 March 1789)
- Feldmarschalleutnant (Lieutenant Field Marshal): 4 March 1796 (effective 12 February 1794)

Swabian Circle of the Empire:

- Feldzeugmeister (General of Infantry): 1796

=== War of the First Coalition ===
In the early days of the French Revolutionary Wars, Karl Aloys zu Fürstenberg remained as brigade commander of a small Austrian corps, approximately 10,000 men, under the overall command of Anton I, Prince Esterházy. He was stationed in the Breisgau, a Habsburg territory between the Black Forest and the Rhine. This location between the forested mountains and the river included two important bridgeheads across the river which offered access to southwestern Germany, the Swiss Cantons, or north-central Germany. His brigade defended Kehl, a small village immediately across the Rhine from Strasbourg, but most of the action in 1792 occurred further north, in present-day Belgium, near the cities of Speyer and Trier, and at Frankfurt on the Main River.

In the second year of the war, Fürstenberg was transferred to the cavalry of Dagobert Sigmund von Wurmser, in the Army of the Upper Rhine, and placed in charge of the advance guard near Speyer, which was still held by the French. On 30 March, he crossed the Rhine by Ketsch at the head of the advance guard, which included 9,000 men. He took the city of Speyer on 1 April, in the absence of the commander of the city, Adam Philippe, Comte de Custine, who was away with most of his troops; those that remained behind simply abandoned the city. On the following day, Fürstenberg occupied the town of Germersheim. His first combat action of the war occurred on 3 April, when Custine's infantry attacked him in a bayonet charge near the villages of Bellheim, Hördt and Leimersheim, and afterward at Landau and Lauterbourg. During these attacks, he lost all the ground he had gained in the days before. After these events, he was again transferred, this time to the command of the Regiment Count von Kavanagh, where he continued to distinguish himself during the French counter-offensive of October–November 1793. In the action around Geidertheim, on the Zorn River, he assisted Lieutenant Field Marshal Gabriel Anton, Baron Splény de Miháldy, in repelling a French counter-attack. Shortly afterward, he became very ill and, in December 1793, was sent to the Hagenau to recover. On 22 December, he rejoined Wurmser's Corps for the Battle of Froeschwiller against Lazare Hoche and Jean-Charles Pichegru. After the French retreated over the Rhine at Huningue, near Basel, he directed the construction of its new fortifications.

In June 1796, Fürstenberg commanded a division of four infantry battalions, 13 artillery pieces, and the Freikorps (Volunteers) Gyulay and secured the Rhine corridor between Kehl and Rastatt. On 26 June 1796, the French Army of the Rhine and Moselle crossed the Rhine and chased the Swabian Circle's military contingent out of Kehl. In June 1796, Archduke Charles added the contingent to Fürstenberg's command, making him the Swabian's Feldzeugmeister, or General of Infantry. Fürstenberg's troops defended the imperial line at the town of Rastatt until support troops arrived, and they could make an orderly withdrawal into the Upper Danube Valley. The Swabian contingent was demobilized in July, and Fürstenberg returned to the command of Austrian regulars during the Austrian counter-offensive. At the Battle of Emmendingen on 19 October 1796, his leadership was again instrumental in an Austrian victory. General Jean Victor Marie Moreau's Army of the Rhine-and-Moselle sought to retain a foothold on the eastern side of the Rhine, following his retreat from southwestern Germany west of the Black Forest. Fürstenberg held Kenzingen, 2.5 miles (4 km) north of Riegel on the Elz River. Karl Aloys zu Fürstenberg was ordered to feint against Riegel, to protect the primary Austrian positions at Rust and Kappel.

In the Battle of Schliengen (24 October 1796), Fürstenberg commanded the second column of the Austrian force, which included nine battalions of infantry and 30 squadrons of cavalry; with these, he overwhelmed the force of General of Division Laurent de Gouvion Saint-Cyr, holding his position to prevent the French force from retreating north on the Rhine. While Maximilian Anton Karl, Count Baillet de Latour, engaged the main Austrian force at Kehl, Archduke Charles entrusted to Lieutenant Field Marshal Fürstenberg the command of the forces besieging Huningue, which included two divisions with 20 battalions of infantry and 40 squadrons of cavalry. Charles' confidence in his young Lieutenant Field marshal was well-placed. On 27 November, Fürstenberg's chief engineer opened and drained the water-filled moat protecting the French fortifications. Fürstenberg offered the commander of the bridgehead, General of Brigade Jean Charles Abbatucci, the opportunity to surrender, which he declined. In the night of 30 November to 1 December, Fürstenberg's force stormed the bridgehead twice, but was twice repulsed. In one of these attacks, the French commander was mortally wounded and died on 3 December. Fürstenberg maintained the siege of Kehl while Archduke Charles engaged the stronger French force to the north of Kehl.

After the French capitulation at Kehl (10 January 1797), Fürstenberg received additional forces with which he could end the siege at Hüningen. He ordered the reinforcement of the ring of soldiers surrounding Hüningen and, on 2 February 1797, the Austrians prepared to storm the bridgehead. General of Division Georges Joseph Dufour, the new French commander, pre-empted what would have been a costly attack, by offering to surrender the bridge. On 5 February, Fürstenberg finally took possession of the bridgehead. Francis II, the Holy Roman Emperor, appointed him as Colonel and Proprietor of the 36th Infantry Regiment, which bore his name until his death in battle in 1799.

=== Peace ===
The Coalition forces—Austria, Russia, Prussia, Great Britain, Sardinia, among others—achieved several victories at Verdun, Kaiserslautern, Neerwinden, Mainz, Amberg and Würzburg, but in northern Italy, they could neither lift nor escape the siege at Mantua. The efforts of Napoleon Bonaparte in northern Italy pushed Austrian forces to the border of Habsburg lands. Napoleon dictated a cease-fire at Leoben on 17 April 1797, leading to the formal Treaty of Campo Formio, which went into effect on 17 October 1797. Austria withdrew from the territories the army had fought so hard to acquire, including the strategic river crossings at Hüningen and Kehl, as well as key cities further north.

When the war ended, Fürstenberg stayed at the Donaueschingen estate of his cousin, Karl Joachim Aloys, who had recently inherited the family title as Fürst zu Fürstenberg. Later in 1797, he traveled to Prague and remained with his family until May 1798, when he received a posting to a new division in Linz. His daughter, Maria Anna, was born after he left, on 17 September 1798.

== Activities in the Second Coalition ==
Despite the longed-for peace, tensions grew between France and most of the First Coalition allies, either separately or jointly. Ferdinand IV of Naples refused to pay agreed-upon tribute to France, and his subjects followed this refusal with a rebellion. The French invaded Naples and established the Parthenopaean Republic. A republican uprising in the Swiss cantons, encouraged by the French Republic which offered military support, led to the overthrow of the Swiss Confederation and the establishment of the Helvetic Republic. On his way to Egypt in Spring 1798, Napoleon had stopped on the Island of Malta and removed the Hospitallers from their possessions. This angered Paul, Tsar of Russia, who was the honorary head of the Order. The ongoing French occupation of Malta angered the British, who dedicated themselves to ejecting the French garrison at Valletta. The French Directory was convinced that the Austrians were conniving to start another war. Indeed, the weaker the French Republic seemed, the more seriously the Austrians, the Neapolitans, the Russians, and the British actually discussed this possibility.

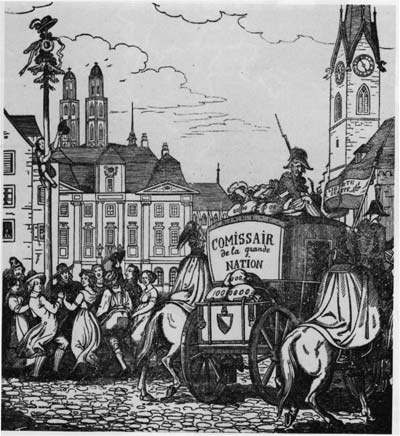
In this caricature about the Helvetic Republic in Zürich (8 May 1798), people from Zürich dance around a tree as a symbol for freedom and revolution while French troops carry away the treasure of the overthrown City-State of Zürich.

As winter broke on 1 March 1799, General Jean Baptiste Jourdan and his 25,000-man Army of the Danube crossed the Rhine at Kehl. The Army of the Danube met little resistance as it advanced through the Black Forest and eventually took a flanking position on the north shore of Lake Constance. Instructed to block the Austrians from access to the Swiss alpine passes, Jourdan planned to isolate the armies of the Coalition in Germany from allies in northern Italy, and prevent them from assisting one another. His was a preemptive strike. By crossing the Rhine in early March, Jourdan acted before Archduke Charles' army could be reinforced by Austria's Russian allies, who had agreed to send 60,000 seasoned soldiers and their more-seasoned commander, Generalissimo Alexander Suvorov. Furthermore, if the French held the interior passes in Switzerland, they could not only prevent the Austrians from transferring troops between northern Italy and southwestern Germany, but could use the routes to move their own forces between the two theaters.

=== Battle of Ostrach ===
At the outbreak of hostilities in March 1799, Karl Aloys zu Fürstenberg was with his troops in Bavarian territory, just north of the free and Imperial city of Augsburg. When news reached the Austrian camp that the French had crossed the Rhine, Charles ordered the imperial army to advance west. Fürstenberg moved his troops toward Augsburg, crossing the Lech River.

The French advanced guard arrived in Ostrach on 8–9 March, and over the next week skirmished with the Austrian forward posts, while the rest of the French army arrived. Jourdan disposed his 25,000 troops along a line from Salem Abbey and Lake Constance to the Danube river, centered in Ostrach. He established his command headquarters at the imperial city of Pfullendorf, overlooking the entire Ostrach valley. Jourdan was expecting Dominique Vandamme's troops to arrive in time to support his far north flank near the river, but Vandamme had gone to Stuttgart to investigate a rumored presence of Austrian troops there and had not rejoined the main army. Consequently, the French left flank, under command of Gouvion Saint-Cyr, was thinly manned. Jourdan thought he had more time, expecting Charles would need still three or four days to move his troops across the Lech, and march to Ostrach, but by the middle of Holy Week in 1799, more than a third of Charles' army, 48,000 mixed troops, was positioned in a formation parallel to Jourdan's, and his 72,000 remaining troops were arrayed with the left wing at Kempten, the center near Memmingen, and the right flank extended to Ulm.

By 21 March, the French and Austrian outposts overlapped, and skirmishing intensified. Charles had divided his force into four columns. Fürstenberg covered the northern flank of the Archduke's main force. Fürstenberg's force pushed the French out of Davidsweiler, and then advanced on Ruppersweiler and Einhard, 5 kilometers (3 mi) to the northwest of Ostrach. Saint-Cyr did not have the manpower to defend the position, and the entire line fell back to Ostrach, with Fürstenberg's troops pressuring their withdrawal. Fürstenberg's persistent pressure on the French left flank was instrumental in the collapse of the northern part of the French line. After their success in driving the French back from Ostrach, and then from the heights of Pfullendorf, the Austrian forces continued to press the French back to Stockach, and then another five miles or so to Engen.

=== Death at the Battle of Stockach (1799) ===
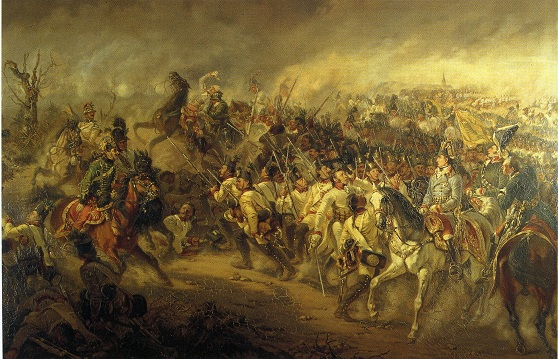
Death of Feldmarschall-Leutnant Karl Aloys zu Fürstenberg while leading Austrian infantry during the battle of Stockach.

On the morning of what they suspected would be the general engagement, Karl Aloys zu Fürstenberg sought out the field chaplain, and requested the sacraments because, as he told his aide, anything can happen during a battle. Although Ostrach had been a hard-fought battle, at Engen and Stockach, the Austrian and French forces were far more concentrated—more men in a smaller space—than they had been at Ostrach, where the French forces in particular had been stretched thinly on a long line from Lake Constance to north of the Danube. At Stockach, furthermore, Jourdan had all his troops under his direct control, with the possible exception of Dominique Vandamme, who was maneuvering his small force of cavalry and light infantry into position to attempt a flanking action on the far right Austrian flank.

In the course of the battle, Jourdan's forces were supposed to engage in simultaneous attacks on the left, center and right of the Austrian line. On the French right, Souham's and Ferino's Corps met with strong resistance and were stopped; on the French left, Lefebvre's troops charged with such force that the Austrians were pushed back. Having stopped Souham's and Ferino's assault, Charles had troops available to counter Lefebvre's force. At that point, Vandamme's men moved into action. Because Souham's assault at the center had been stalled, Charles still had enough men to turn part of his force to fight this new threat, but the Austrians were hard pressed and the action furious. At one point, Charles attempted to lead his eight battalions of Hungarian grenadiers into action, to the dismay of the old soldiers. Fürstenberg reportedly said that while he lived, he would not leave this post (at the head of the grenadiers) and the Archduke should not dismount and fight. As Fürstenberg led the Hungarian grenadiers into the battle, he was cut down by a canister and case shot employed by the French. Although he was carried alive off the field, he died almost immediately. Charles ultimately did lead his grenadiers into battle, and reportedly his personal bravery rallied his troops to push back the French. After the battle, someone removed Fürstenberg's wedding ring and returned it to his wife in Prague, with news of his death; Fürstenberg was buried at the battlefield cemetery in Stockach, and his cousin erected a small monument there, but in 1857, his body was moved to the family cemetery, Maria Hof at Neudingen, near Donaueschingen.

== Family ==
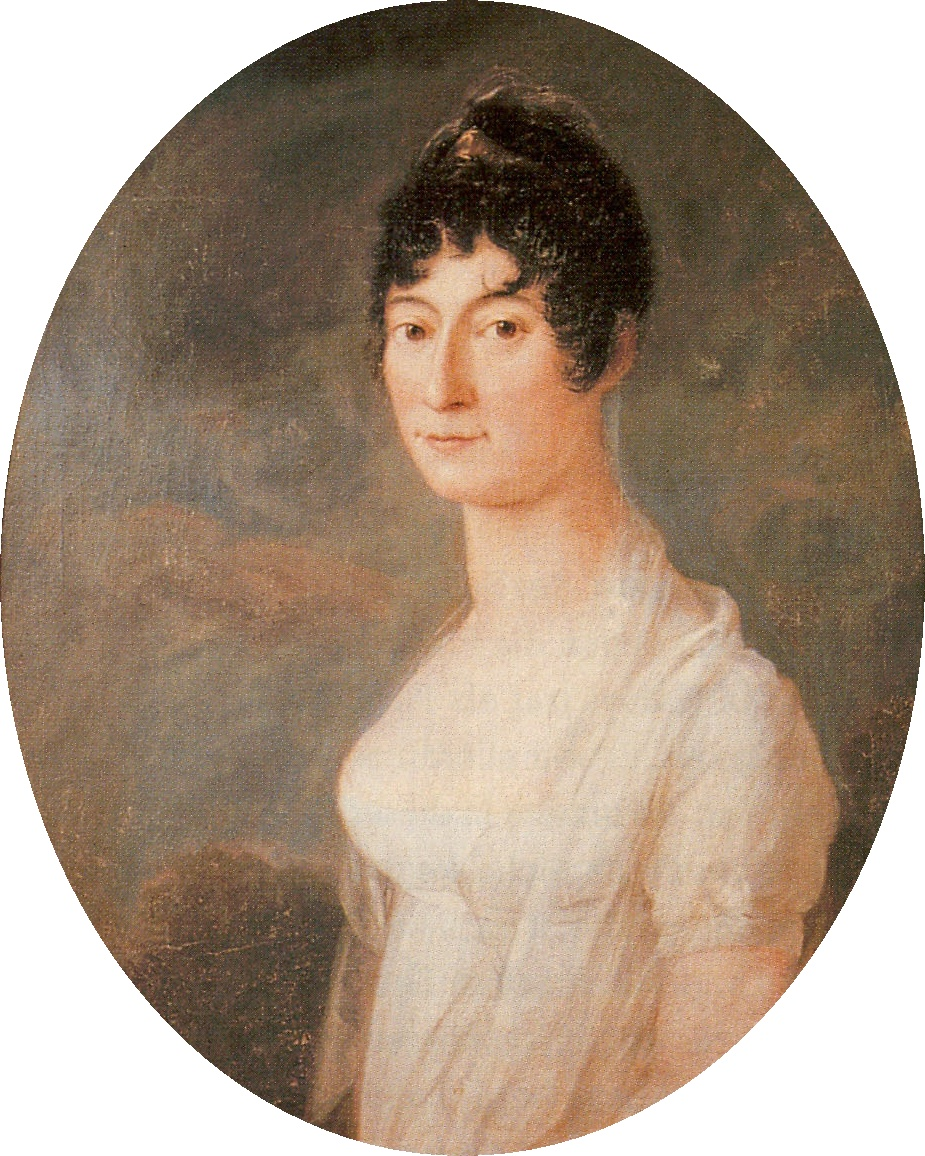
Princess Elisabeth of Thurn and Taxis, who married Karl Aloys in 1790.

Upon the death of Prosper Ferdinand, Count Fürstenberg, in the War of the Spanish Succession, in 1704 the Fürstenberg inheritance was divided between the count's two youngest sons, Joseph Wilhelm Ernst and Wilhelm Egon; the eldest son was an ecclesiastic. The family of Fürstenberg was raised to princely status 2 February 1716, with the elevation of Joseph Wilhelm Ernst (1699 – 1762), as the first Prince of Fürstenberg (German: Fürst zu Fürstenberg).

Joseph Wilhelm Ernst died in 1762, leaving two sons: the elder son, Joseph Wenzel, succeeded him as the second prince. The younger son, Karl Egon (1729 – 1786), served as a governor in Bohemia. Joseph Wenzel's line died out in 1804, and Karl Aloys's son Karl Egon II succeeded as the fifth and final Prince of Fürstenberg, before the house was mediatised in 1806, due to German mediatisation.

Children of Karl Aloys zu Fürstenberg and Elizabeth, Princess of Thurn und Taxis, were:

- Marie Leopoldine (Prague, 4 September 1791 – Kupferzell, 10 January 1844); married at Heiligenberg, 20 May 1813 to Charles Albert III, Prince of Hohenlohe-Waldenburg-Schillingsfürst (Vienna, 29 February 1776 – Bad Mergentheim, 15 June 1843)
- Maria Josepha (9 September 1792)
- Antonie (28 October 1794 – 1 October 1799)
- Karl Egon II (Prague, 28 October 1796 – Bad Ischl, 22 October 1854), succeeded his cousin, Karl Joachim, as the fifth Prince of Fürstenberg in 1804. He married on 19 April 1818, to Amalie of Baden (Karlsruhe, 26 January 1795 – Karlsruhe, 14 September 1869).
- Maria Anna, 17 September 1798 – 18 July 1799

== Ancestry ==
Ancestors of Karl Aloys zu Fürstenberg

8. Prosper, Landgrave of Fürstenberg-Stühlingen
4. Joseph Wilhelm Ernst, Prince of Fürstenberg
9. Countess Sophie von Königsegg-Rothenfels
2. Charles Egon I, Prince of Fürstenberg
10. Count Johann Josef von Waldstein-Wartenberg
5. Countess Maria Anna von Waldstein-Wartenberg
11. Countess Eleonore Maria von Waldstein
1. Karl Aloys, Prince of Fürstenberg
12. Count Franz Damian von Sternberg
6. Count Franz Philipp von Sternberg
13. Countess Maria Josepha von und zu Trauttmansdorff
3. Countess Maria Josepha von Sternberg
14. Count Conrad Sigmund von Starhemberg
7. Countess Leopoldine von Starhemberg
15. Princess Maria Leopoldine zu Löwenstein-Wertheim-Rochefort

Military offices
Preceded by Franz de Paula Ulrich, Prince Kinsky of Wchinitz und Tettau	Proprietor (Inhaber) of Infantry Regiment N°36; 1797–1799	Succeeded by Johann Kollowrat
