= Donaueschingen Palace =

Palace of the princes of Fürstenberg in Donaueschingen, Baden-Württemberg, Germany

Coordinates: 47.949925741°N 8.501679897°E

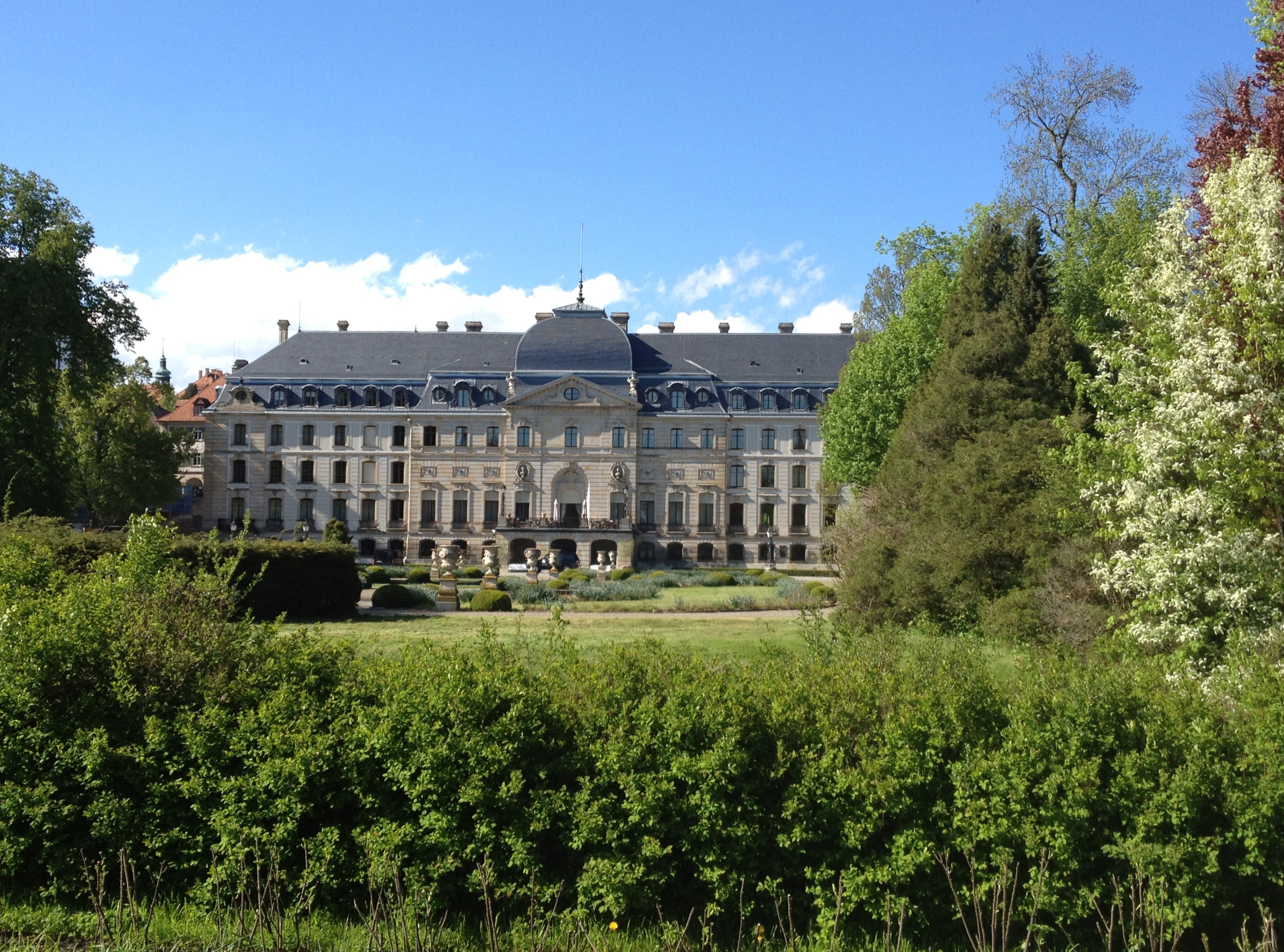
Donaueschingen palace

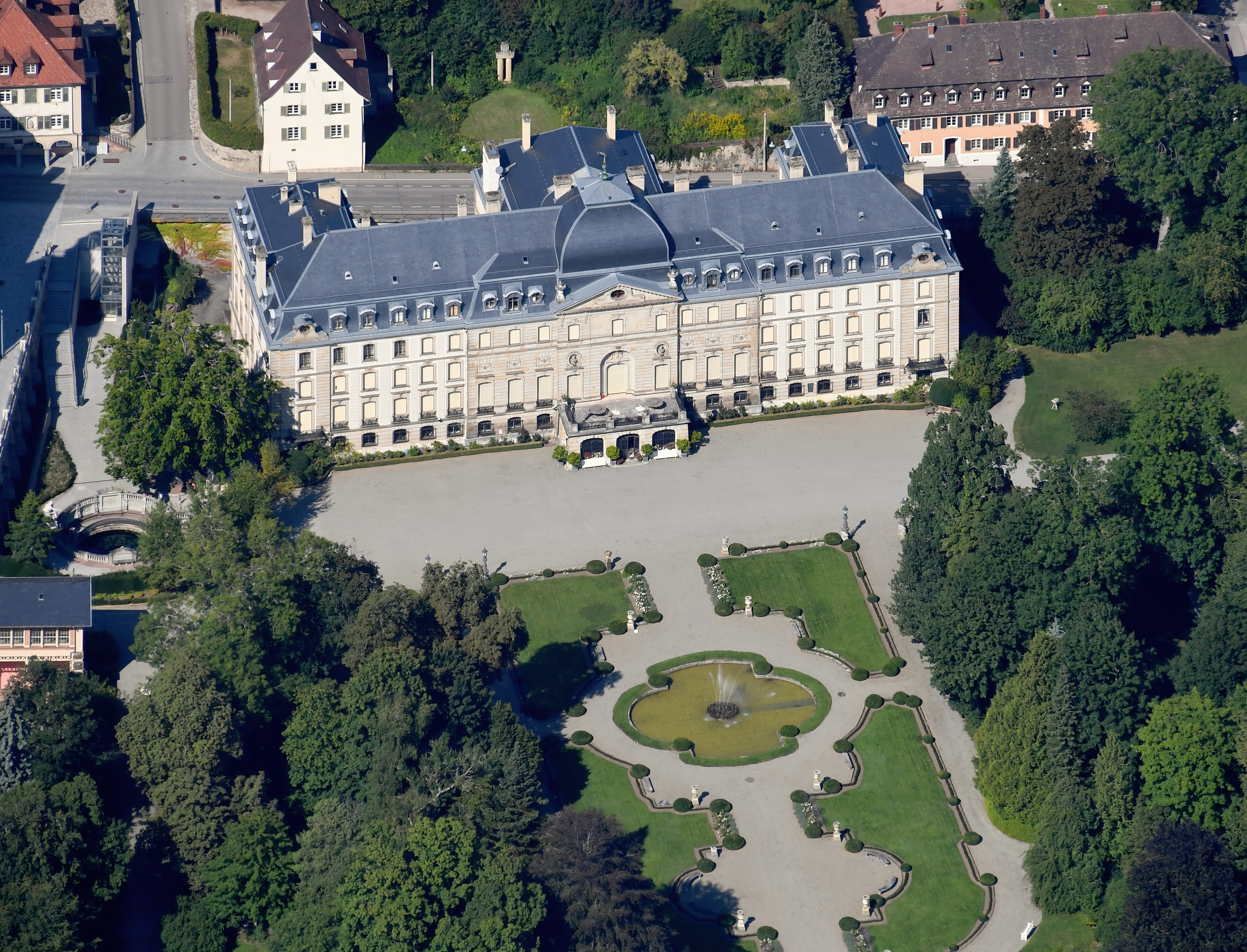
View from the air of Donaueschingen palace with the source of the Danube on the left

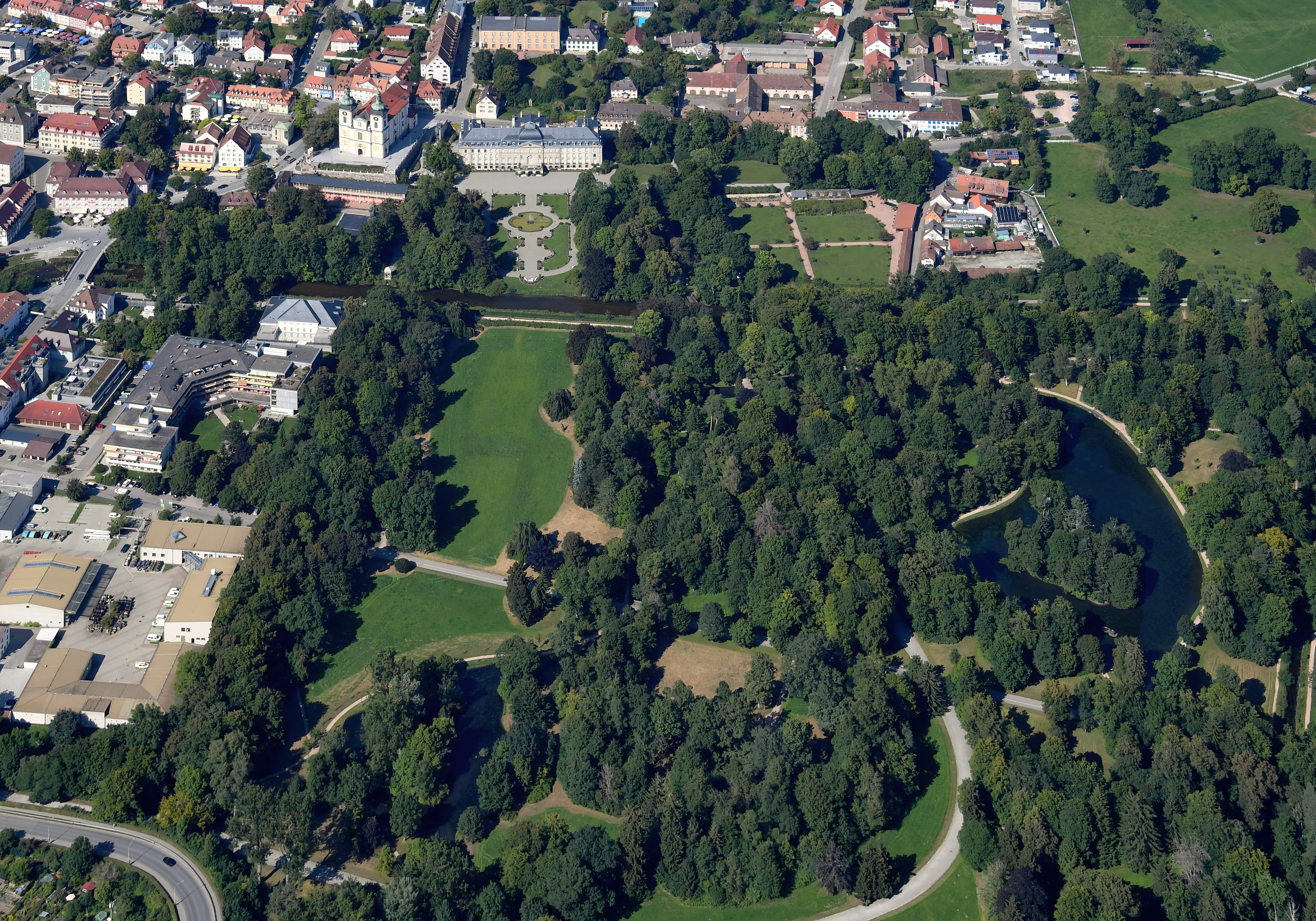
View of the palace and the park

Donaueschingen Palace (German: Schloss Donaueschingen), also known as the Fürstenberg palace (German: Fürstlich Fürstenbergisches Schloss), is a princely residence in French Baroque Revival architecture. It is situated in Donaueschingen, Baden-Württemberg, Germany. It is the seat of the princes of Fürstenberg, who still own and live in the palace. It is surrounded by a large park, where next to the palace the source of the Danube is located in the northwestern edge. The palace can be visited during guided tours, as well as rented for events

== History ==
=== 17th century and prior: Before the current palace was constructed ===
In the 14th and 15th centuries, there was already a fortified house here, which was owned by a member of the Blumberg family in 1292. By 1488, the House of Fürstenberg acquired Donaueschingen from Barbara von Habsburg and subsequently abandoned their castle Burg Entenburg.

Around 1556, Count Friedrich II of Fürstenberg (1496–1559) commissioned the construction of a (much smaller) predecessor building at the site of the current palace. However, this construction was erected on weak foundations and remained unfinished for a long time until his son Henry completed the construction and frequently stayed here, after he inherited the Baar region from his brothers. In his work Donaustrand, Sigmund von Birken depicts a view of the village with the old castle (around 1680).

=== First half 18th century: Donaueschingen becomes the main Fürstenberg residence ===
At the start of the 18th century, the territories of the Fürstenberg family were divided over various territories: the county of Heiligenberg, the lordship of Meßkirch, and the county of Stühlingen. But as all family branches except one became extinct, the territories were reunified into one principality of Fürstenberg by 1744. As the village of Donaueschingen was centrally located, Joseph Wilhelm Ernst, Prince of Fürstenberg (1699–1762) decided to move his capital from Stühlingen to here. The decision was made in 1720, but only happened in 1723. And Donaueschingen remained the main seat when the Meßkirch branch died in 1744. The village transferred from a settlement into a city.

As the existing building did not meet the requirements for the new capital of the principality, the decision was made to replace it by a new palace. František Maxmilián Kaňka was engaged to make the design for the palace in baroque style. Initially, plans were conceived for a grandiose complex comprising three wings with a large basin fed by the Danube basin. However, things turned out quite differently, and for one simple reason: In 1723, Prince Josef Wilhelm Ernst married Countess Anna Maria von Waldstein. His attention shifted to Prague, where Bohemia became his new focus. With a keen eye for finances, the lavish palace plans were set aside. Instead, only a side wing was built, serving as both administrative offices and living quarters for numerous princely officials. The building was rather plain and functional. It had approximately the same dimensions as the palace today: four stories high, 21 windows wide with a Mansard roof. Old illustrations (such as those by Jakob Alt from 1824 and Wilhelm Scheuchzer from 1827) depict it as a simple but dignified and generous structure.

In the vicinity of the palace, further buildings were constructed such as the princely court library between 1732 and 1735, the Fürstenberg Brewery between 1705 and 1739, and the princely archives between 1756 and 1763.

== Gallery: Donaueschingen Palace in the 17th and 18th century ==
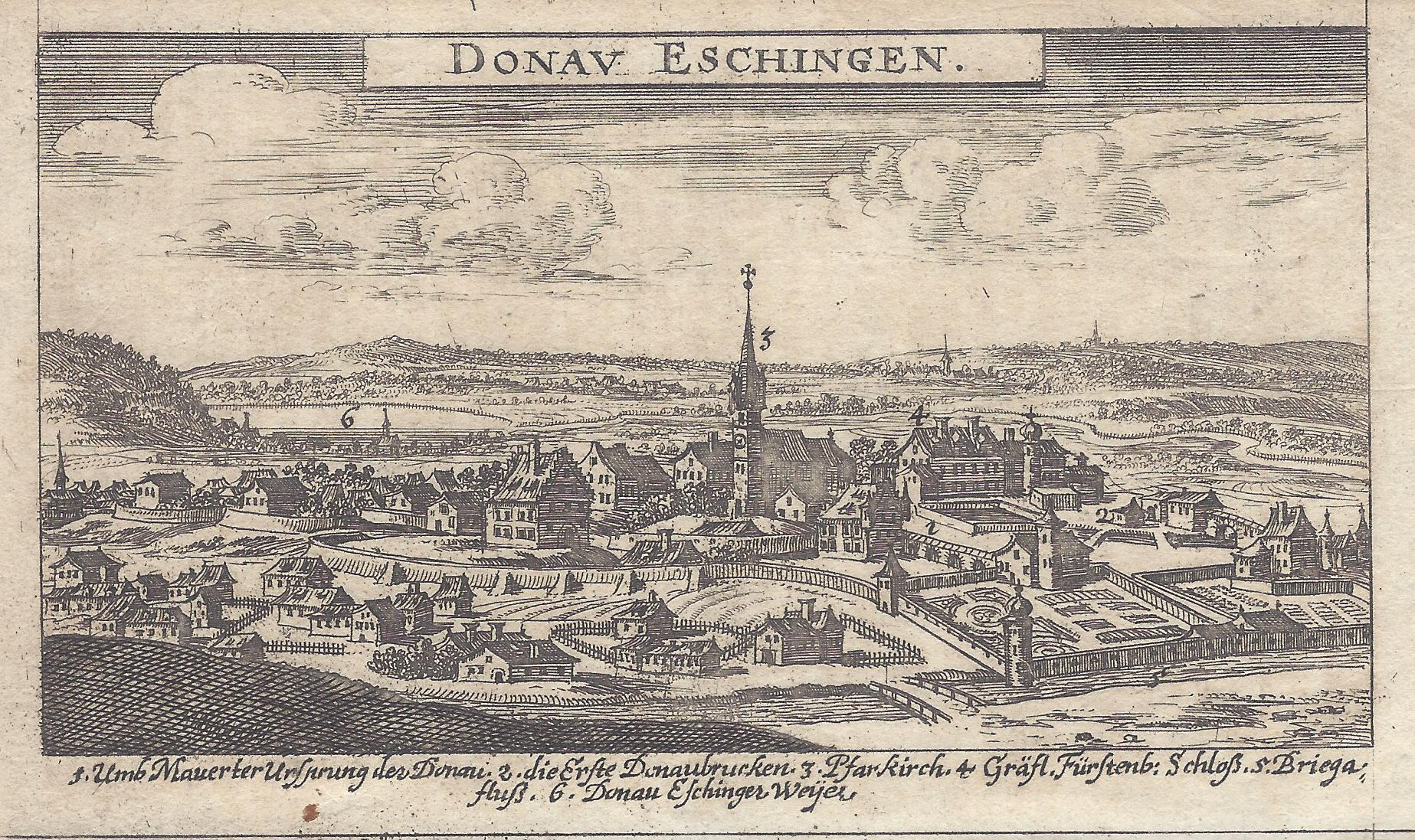
Donaueschingen around 1680

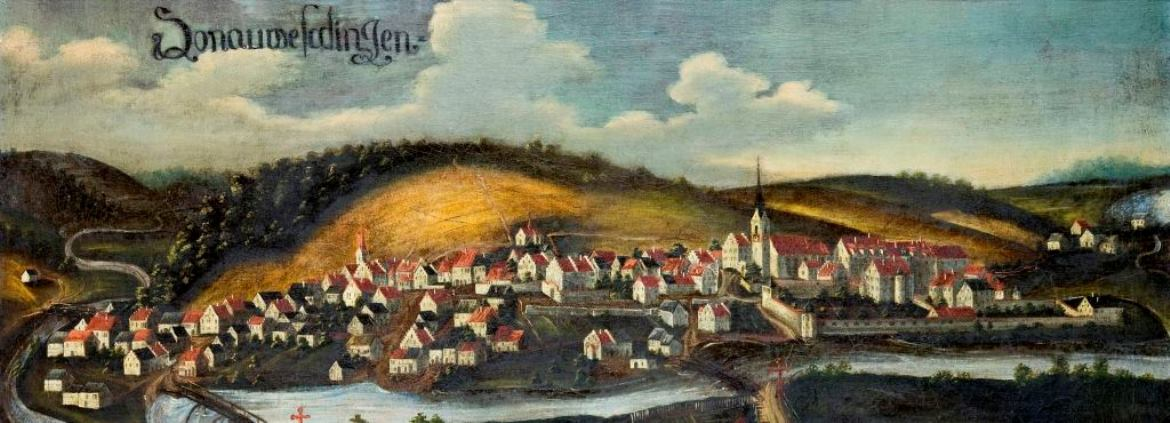
Donaueschingen village and castle around 1680

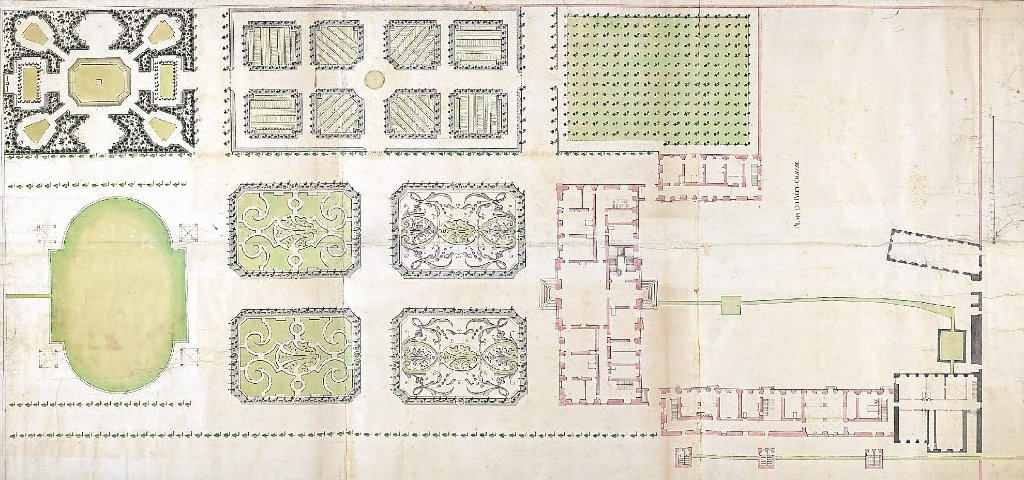
The original design from 1722 for Donaueschingen palace. Ultimately only the wing right below was realized. The right corner was ravaged by fire in 1821

=== Second half 18th century: Donaueschingen becomes a vivid residence ===
So in the first years as residence, Donaueschingen palace was primarily an administrative seat. This changed under Joseph Wilhelm Ernst's son, prince Joseph Wenzel (1728–1783), who made Donaueschingen his main residence. Naturally, he moved into the palace – a decision that caused significant unrest among the officials who had previously resided there and subsequently triggered extensive construction activity: suitable housing had to be provided for all the employees. In addition, new buildings were required for the administration, which also had been housed in the palace until then. The city of Donaueschingen experienced a true building boom.

From 1770 onwards, Joseph Wenzel had the magnificent palace park laid out, established a court chapel, built hunting lodges, and even erected a court theater. As for the palace itself, Joseph Wenzel left it as it was – a modest and, despite its size, almost austere structure.

=== First half 19th century: a fire ravages the palace ===
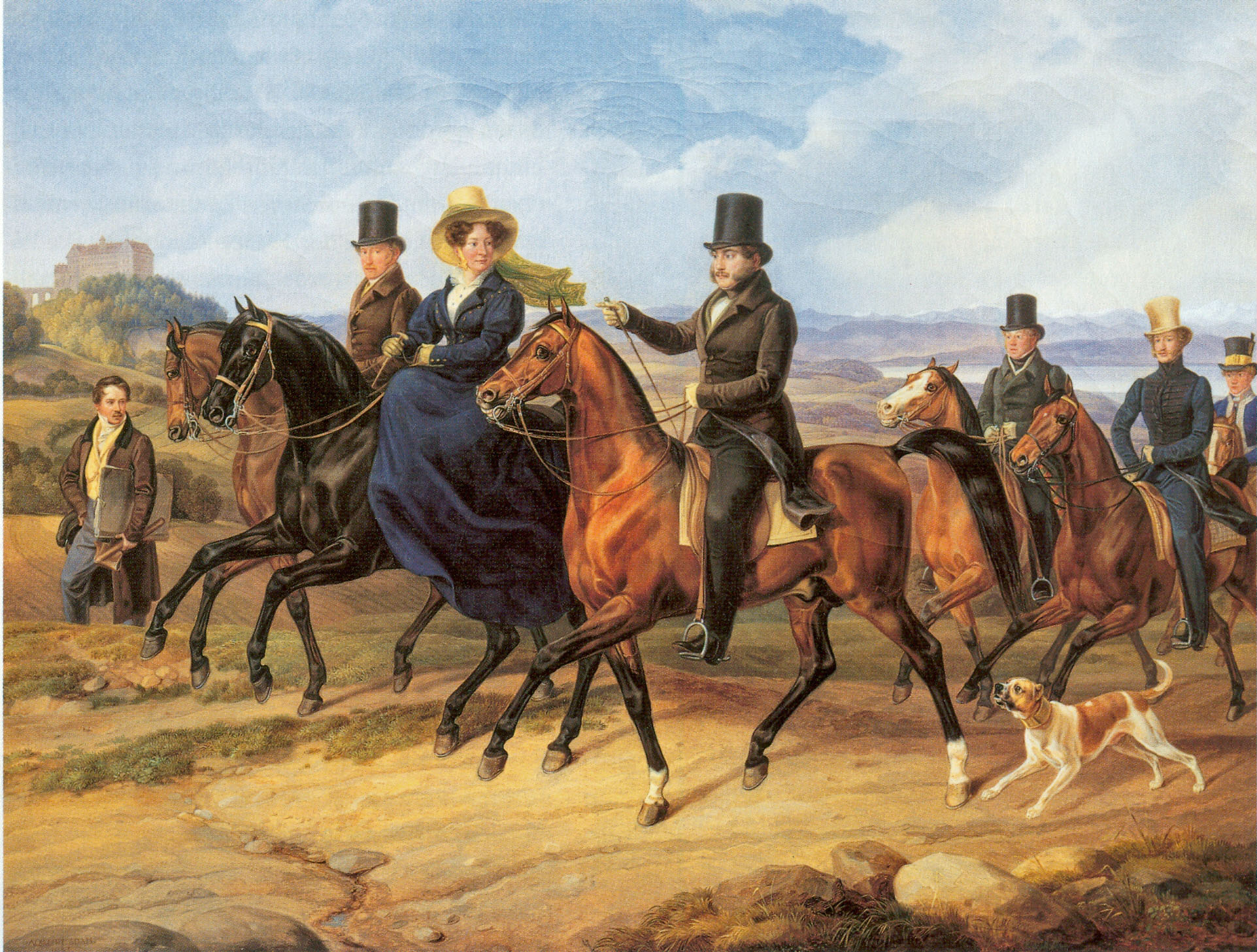
Charles Egon II and Amalia of Baden riding in front of Schloss Heiligenberg, another Fürstenberg castle

On December 8, 1821, a fire destroyed the old western part of the castle, including the St. Nicholas Chapel, forcing the young princely couple – Charles Egon II, Prince of Fürstenberg (1796–1854) and his wife Amalie (1795–1869) – to reside in the Karlshof until the burned part of the palace was replaced in 1828. This property on Josephstraße had recently been purchased by Major von Koller († December 5, 1834). After the burned parts were demolished, a neoclassical ballroom was constructed on the second floor according to designs by the Baden architect Friedrich Weinbrenner, which can be considered his final work.

The ‘‘Karlsbau’’ with the princely collections was completed in 1868. Until then (1865), the collections had been housed in schloss Hüfingen, a castle constructed built in 1712 by prince Froben Ferdinand of Fürstenberg-Mößkirch (1664-1741).

=== Second half 19th century: the Belle Époque arrives in Donaueschingen ===
Between 1892 and 1896, Charles Egon IV, Prince of Fürstenberg (1852–1896) undertook a significant reconstruction of the palace, both inside and outside. Amand Bauqué, a French architect based in Vienna, was commissioned for the design, with support from architect Albert Emilio Pio. They embraced the popular baroque revival style, prevalent in Paris and Vienna during that era, known as the Belle Époque. The main façade facing the garden was adorned with an Avant-corps to rhythmize the endless rows of windows. The roof underwent a redesign, featuring a central dome. Atop the central part of the façade, the coat of arms of the Fürstenberg family is displayed alongside two ancient imperial busts of Marcus Aurelius and Lucius Verus, acquired specifically for this purpose in Rome in 1895.

Additionally, the interior was adorned with a grand staircase, leading to an adjoining hall and apartments in Louis XV style. Concurrently, the park underwent a transformation, echoing the baroque revival aesthetic, including a revision of the Danube source. Despite a few modernisations, the palace has retained its original character ever since.

In 1894, the Stallegg hydroelectric power plant was also constructed to provide lighting to the palace and park, and energy for the Fürstenberg Brewery.

== Gallery: Donaueschingen Palace in the 19th century ==
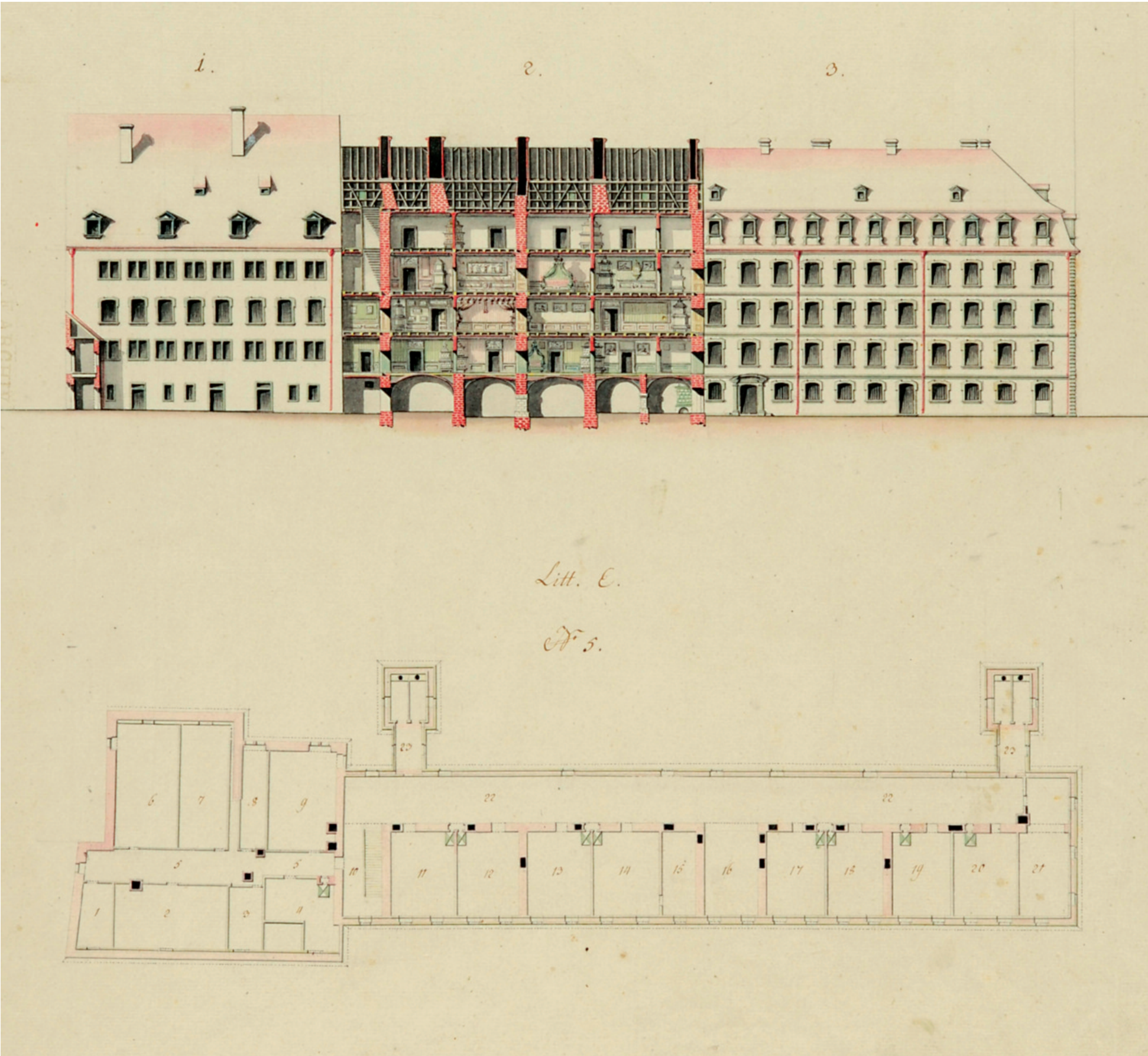
Looking inside the palace: plan and facade (1801)

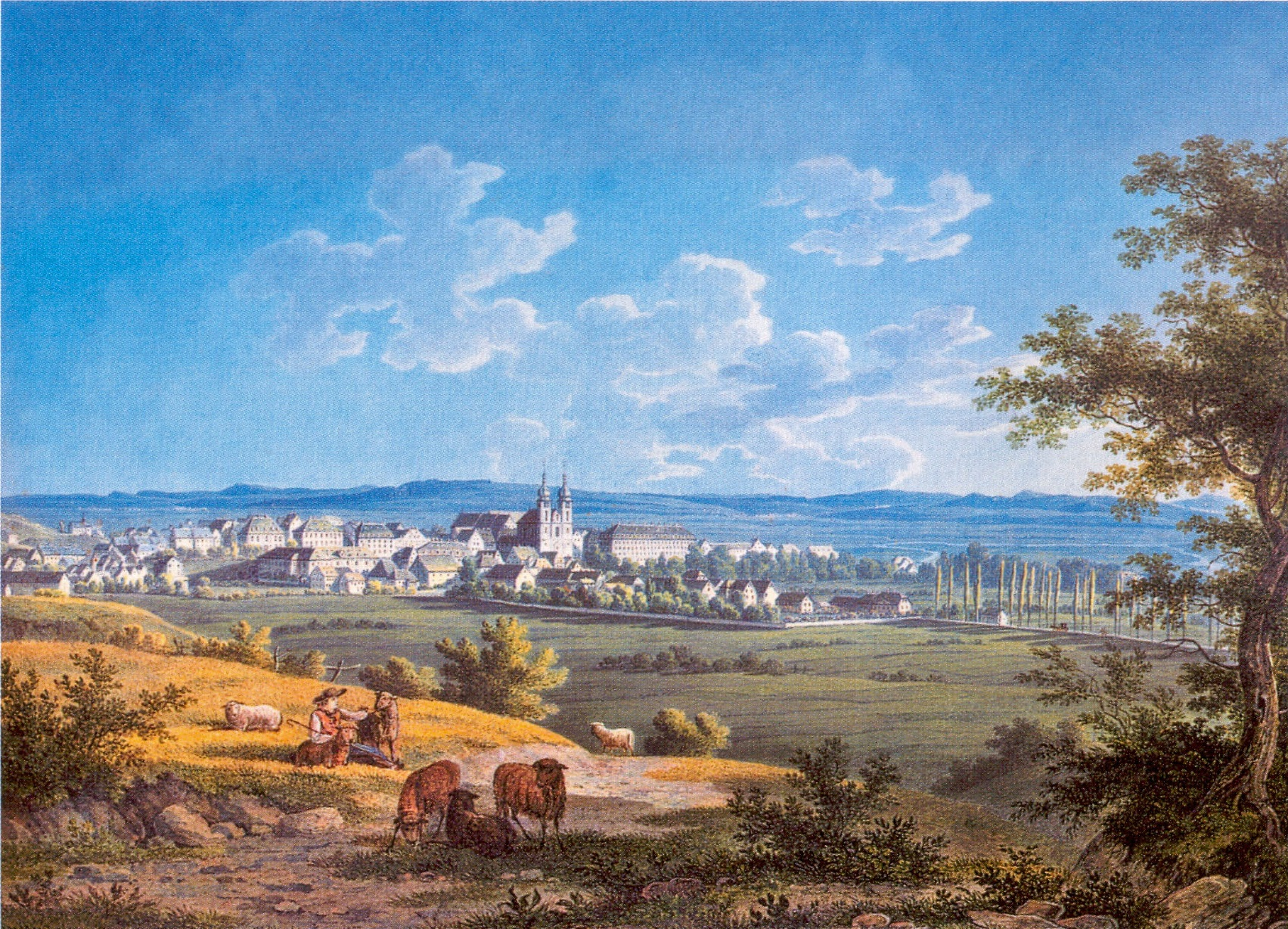
The city of Donaueschingen with the Palace right next to church (1820)

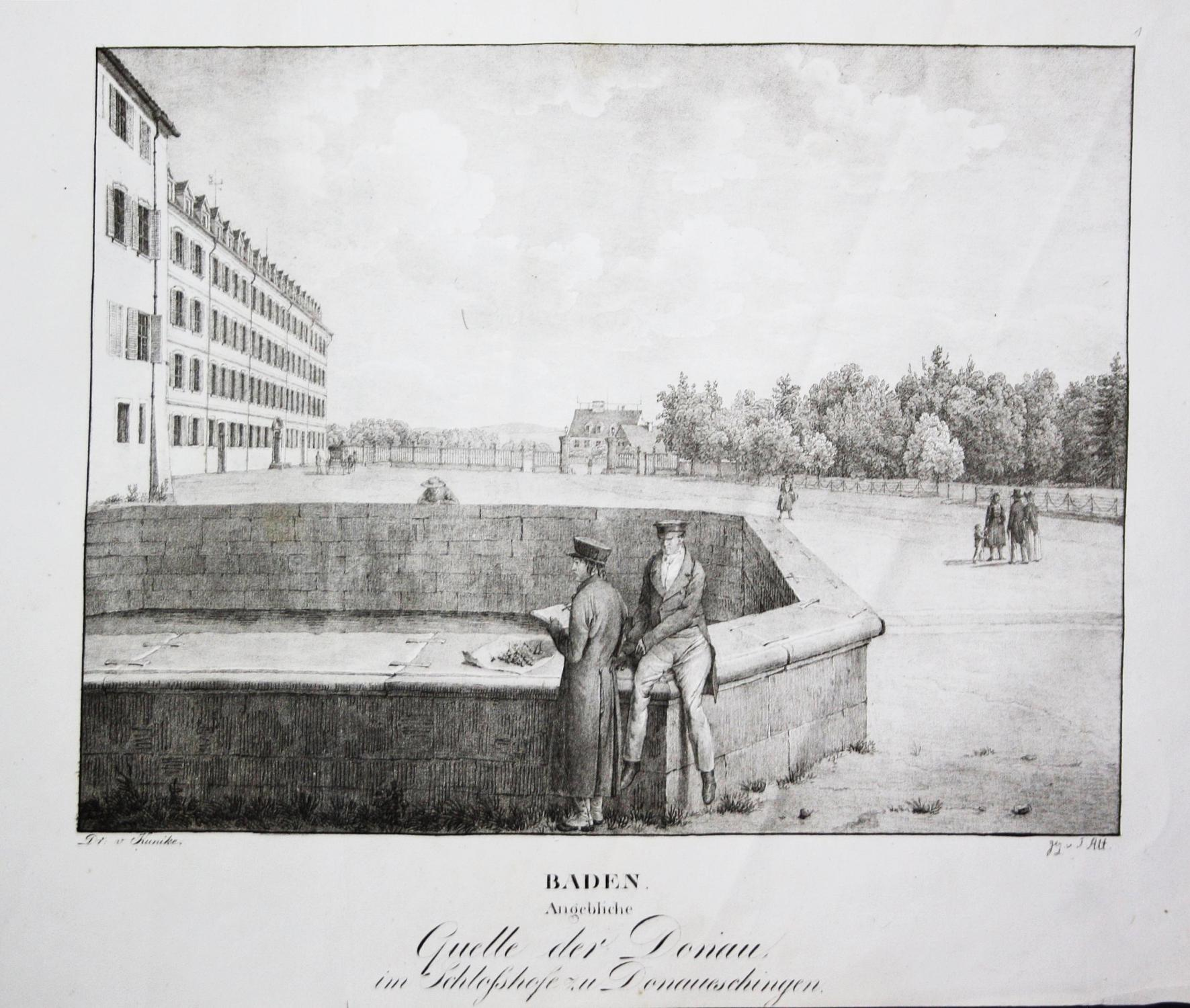
Donaueschingen Palace in 1826 before the rebuilding with the source of the Danube

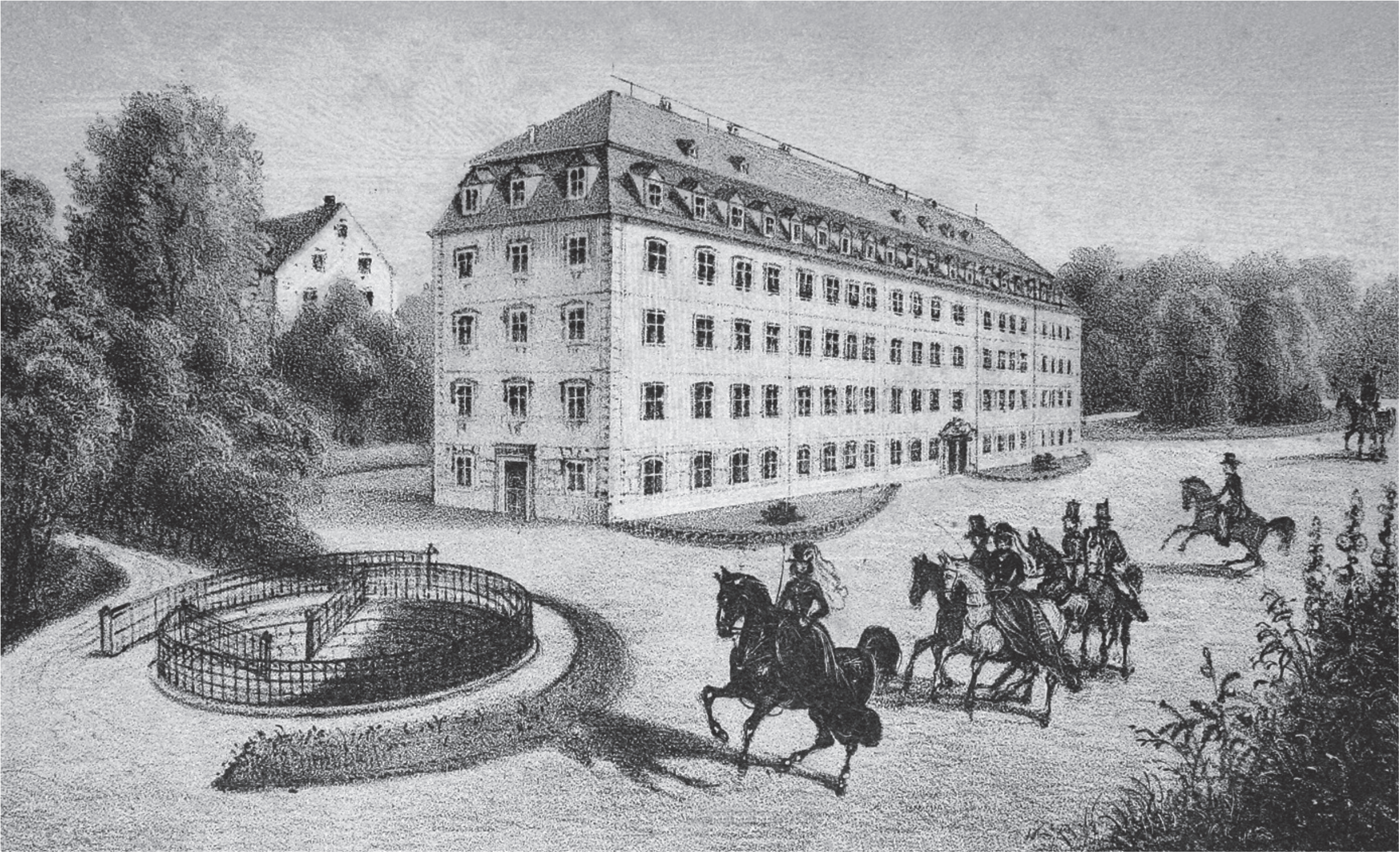
Donaueschingen Palace in 1828

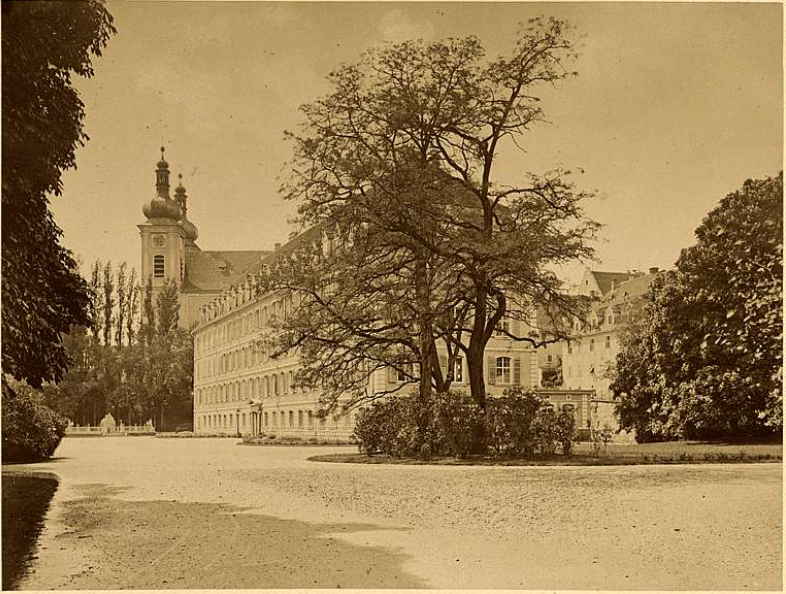
The palace before the reconstruction in the 1870s

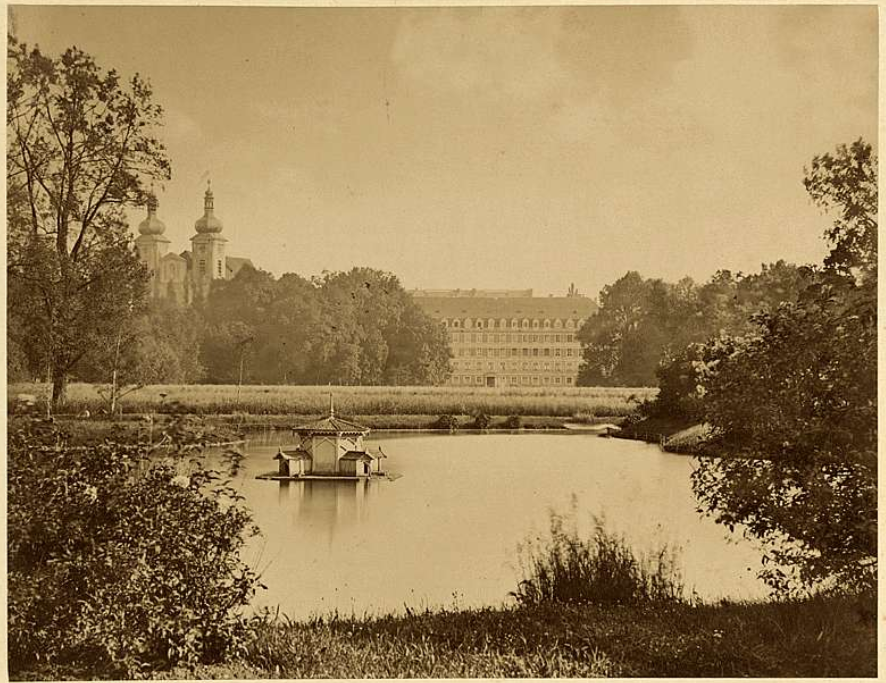
The palace and park before the reconstruction in the 1870s

=== First half 20th century: center of the German imperial jet-set ===
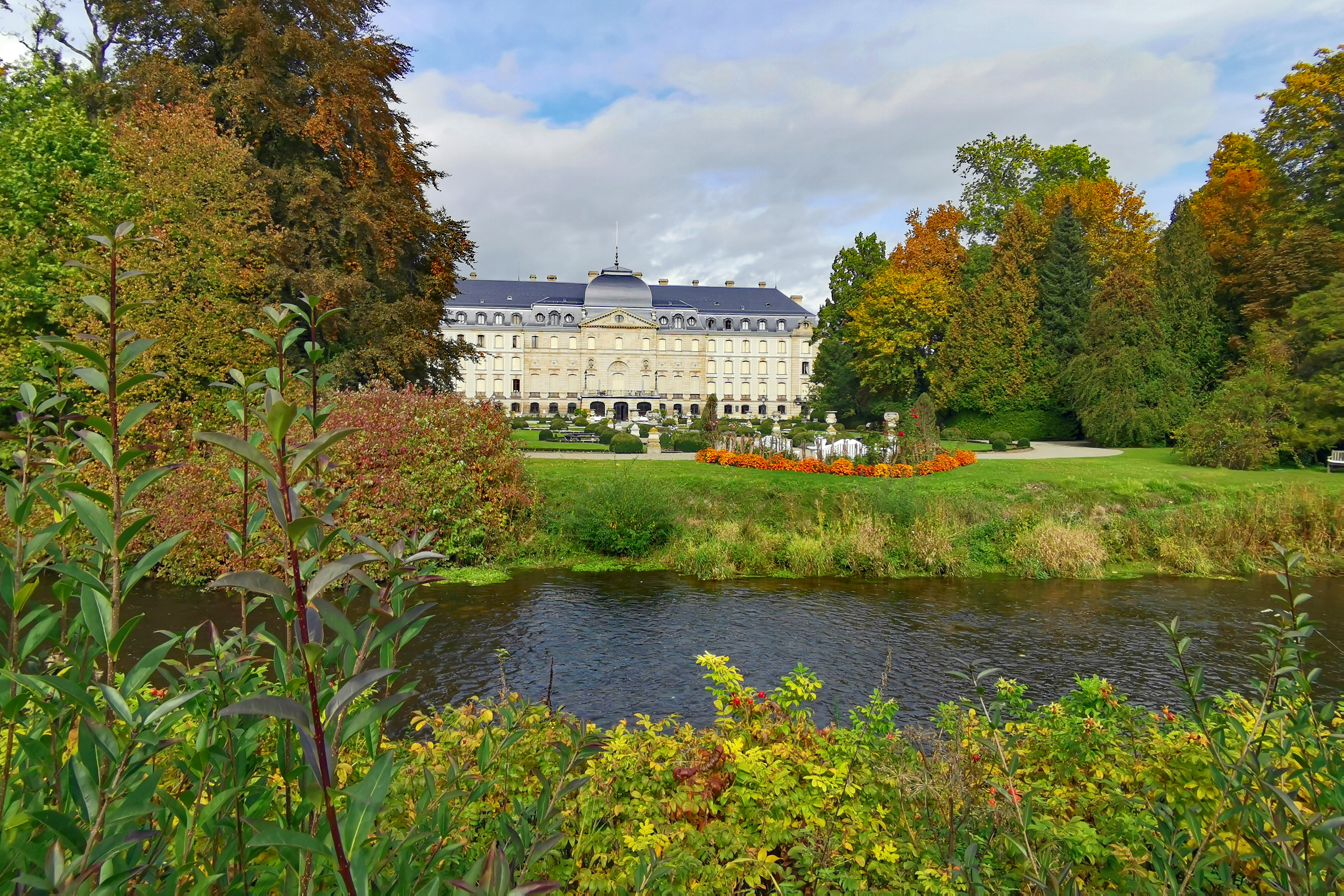
The palace in the middle of the princely park

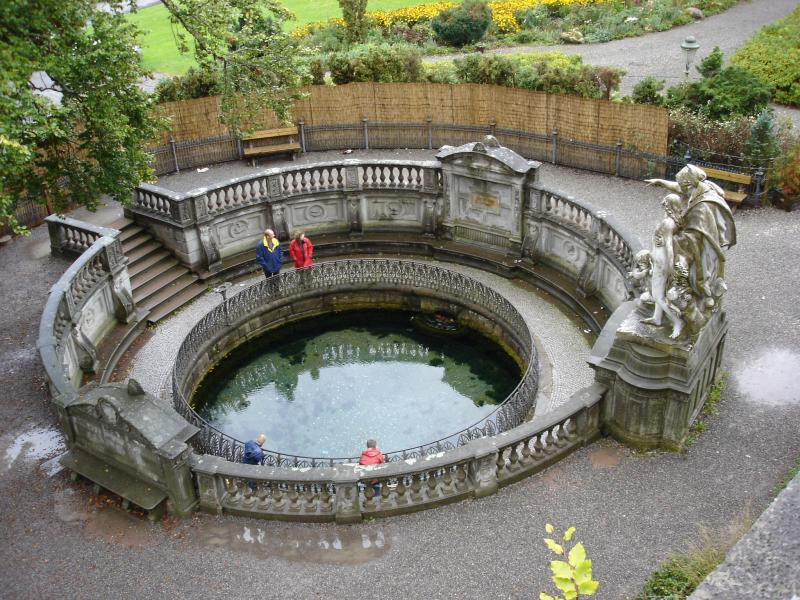
The princely park contains the source of the Danube river

Charles Egon IV was succeeded by Maximilian Egon II, Prince of Fürstenberg (1863–1941), who was a close friend and adviser of Emperor Wilhelm II of Germany. He inherited territorial titles in Prussia, Austria, Hungary, Württemberg and Baden, and by virtue of them had a seat in the House of Lords in each of the five states. Until the First World War, he was vice-president of the Prussian House of Lords. Donaueschingen was Max's main seat and emperor Wilhelm II frequently visited him there.

Maximillian Egon II engaged the architects of Donaueschingen, Bauqué and Pio, to also redesign the main Fürstenberg country seat in Bohemia, Lány Castle, which is now the summer residence of the president of the Czech Republic.

=== Modern times ===
During the mid of the 20th century, the main seat of the Fürstenberg princes was Schloss Hohenlupfen in Stühlingen. But in the 1970s, they moved back to Donaueschingen. In the meantime, the palace was opened to the general public.

The current head of the Fürstenberg family, prince Henry moved into the palace in 2002. He started an extensive renovation of the palace, which was completed in 2007. Also he restructured his estates, which resulted in the sale of Hohenlupfen castle.

In 2023, the princely family hosted a large event celebrating 300 years Donaueschingen.

== Interior ==
The interior design and furniture in neo-styles represent the periods from the Renaissance through Régence and Rococo to the Empire period. Noteworthy is the reception hall illuminated by a skylight, which houses, among other things, a wooden bench from around 1520 from the Strozzi family and a Florentine sandstone fireplace from around 1480. Both were acquired through the mediation of the art historian and Berlin museum director Wilhelm von Bode. The Great and Small Salons, the dining room, and the surprisingly modern bathroom for the princess at that time are also worth seeing.

== Music at the Palace ==
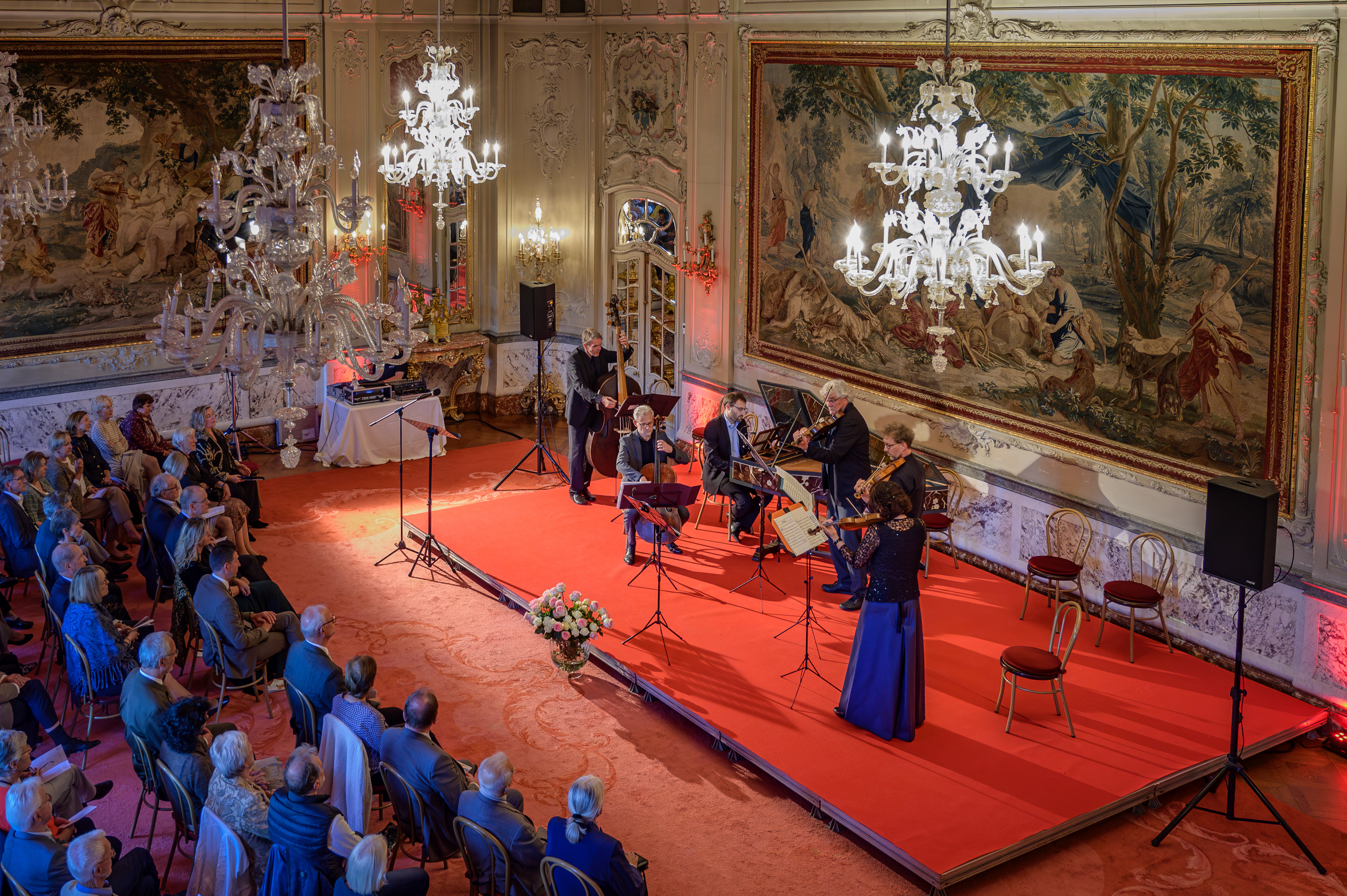
A musical performance in the palace

In 1763, the Mozart family visited Donaueschingen for twelve days, during which the ten-year-old Wolfgang Amadeus Mozart composed a cello piece for Prince Joseph Wenzel of Fürstenberg and received 24 gold ducats in return. Later, the operas Die Entführung aus dem Serail and The Marriage of Figaro premiered here in Germany for the first time. Pieces by Béla Bartók, Paul Hindemith, Anton von Webern, or Richard Strauss also premiered here.

In 1921, the first "chamber music performances to promote contemporary music" took place in this ballroom, which later led to the famous Donaueschingen Music Days.

== Literature ==
- Feger, Robert (1984). Burgen und Schlösser in Südbaden (in German). München. ISBN 3-8035-1237-9.
- John, Timo (1998). "Der Fürstlich Fürstenbergische Schloßpark zu Donaueschingen". Die Gartenkunst (in German): 169–184.
- Feldhahn, Ulrich (1999). "Wilhelm von Bode und das Haus Fürstenberg". Schriften des Vereins für Geschichte und Naturgeschichte der Baar (in German). 42. Donaueschingen: Selbstverlag des Vereins für Geschichte und Naturgeschichte der Baar: 25–50.
- Feldhahn, Ulrich (2000). "Die Kaiserbüsten am Donaueschinger Schloss. Marc Aurel und Lucius Verus als Sinnbild der Idee des "Imperiums"". Almanach 2000. Heimatjahrbuch des Schwarzwald-Baar-Kreises (in German). Vöhrenbach: Landratsamt Schwarzwald-Baar-Kreis/ DoldVerlag. pp. 155–159.
- Feldhahn, Ulrich (2016). ""Ein Prunk-Saal in dem Schlosse zu Donaueschingen" – Anmerkungen zum bislang unbekannten letzten Werk des Architekten Friedrich Weinbrenner". Zeitschrift für die Geschichte des Oberrheins (in German). 164. Stuttgart: Kommission für geschichtliche Landeskunde in Baden-Württemberg: 523–432.
- Merten, Klaus (1987). Schlösser in Baden-Württemberg (in German). München: Verlag C.H. Beck. p. 206. ISBN 3-406-32307-3.
- "Donaueschingen Das mit dem Schloss war ja eigentlich ganz anders geplant". www.schwarzwaelder-bote.de/ (in German). Schwarzwälder-Bote. 14 September 2011.
