= Blackslash =

German metal band

Blackslash is a German heavy metal band from Baden-Württemberg. They have released five albums, mostly on Iron Shield Records.

The band hails from Donaueschingen.

== Select discography ==
- Separate but Equal (2013)
- Sinister Lightning (2015)
- Lightning Strikes Again (2018)
- No Steel No Future (2022)
- Heroes, Saints & Fools (2025)
