= Joseph Wilhelm Ernst, Prince of Fürstenberg =

Joseph Wilhelm Ernst
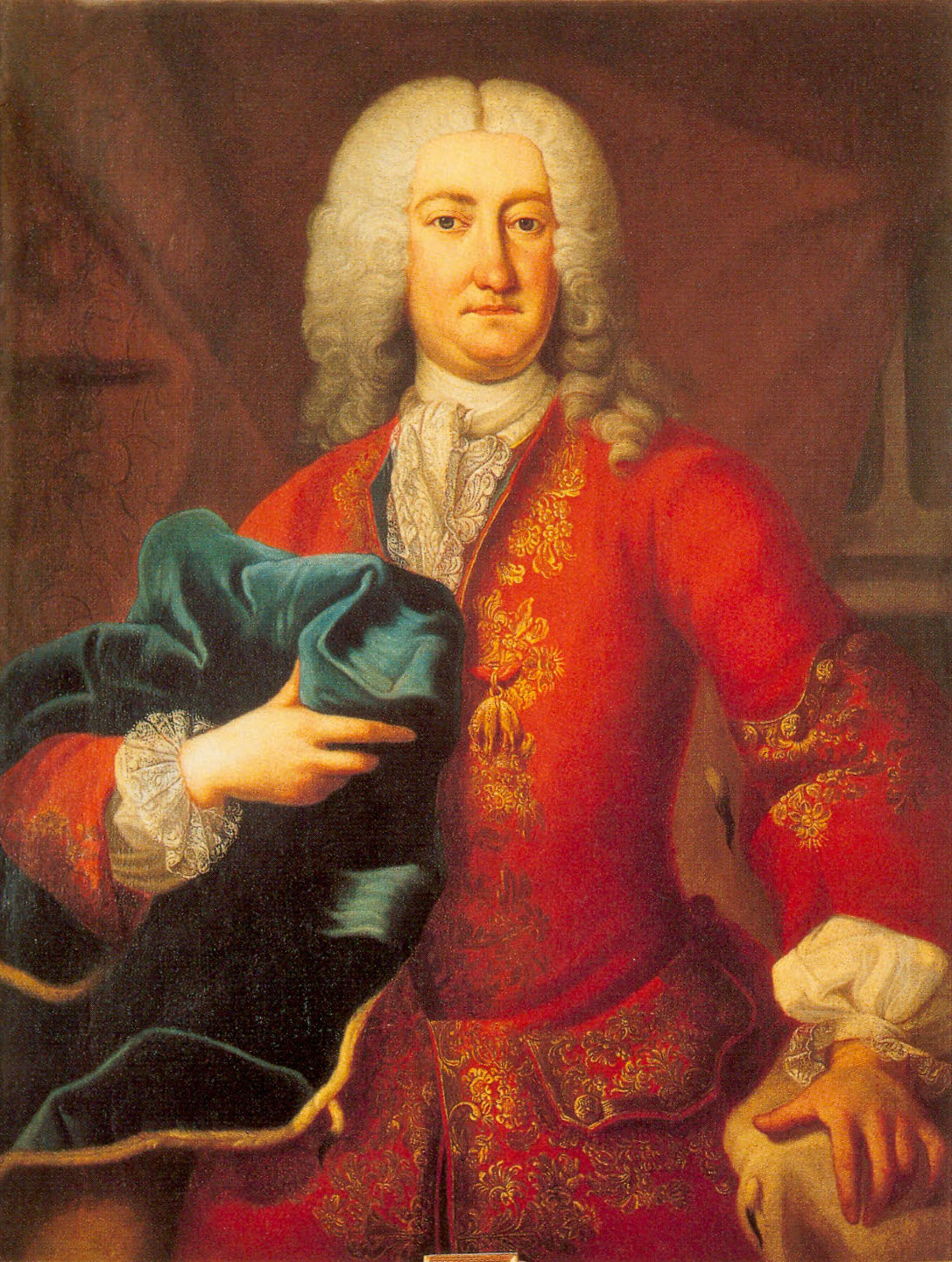
- Born: 13 April 1699; Augsburg
- Died: 29 April 1762 (aged 63); Vienna
- Noble family: House of Fürstenberg
- Father: Prosper von Fürstenberg-Stühlingen
- Mother: Sophie von Königsegg-Rothenfels

Joseph Wilhelm Ernst, Prince of Fürstenberg (13 April 1699 - 29 April 1762) was a prince of Fürstenberg-Fürstenberg who changed his residence to Donaueschingen, at the head of the Danube, and thus converted the existing settlement into a town and constructed Schloss Donaueschingen.

== Early life ==
Born as a member of the House of Fürstenberg Joseph was the second son of Landgrave Prosper von Fürstenberg-Stühlingen (1662–1704) and his wife, Countess Sophie Anna Eusebia von Königsegg-Rothenfels (1674–1727).

== Title of Fürst ==
On 2 December 1716 Joseph was awarded with the hereditary title of Fürst by Charles VI, Holy Roman Emperor.

== Marriages and issue ==
On 6 June 1723 he married Countess Maria Anna von Waldstein-Wartenberg, heiress of Pürglitz (1707-1756). They had six children:

- Joseph Wenzel (1728–1783)
- Karl Egon (1729 - 1787), married Countess Maria Josepha von Sternberg (1735-1803), father of Karl Aloys zu Fürstenberg
- Maria Augusta Josepha (1731–1770), Abbess in Hradčany
- Maria Henriette Josepha (1732–1772), married Alexander Ferdinand, 3rd Prince of Thurn and Taxis, had issue
- Maria Emmanuele Sophie (1733–1776)
- Maria Theresia Josepha (1736–1774)

In 1761 he married 37 years younger Countess Maria Anna von der Wahl (1736-1808). They didn't have children.
