= Joseph Maria, Prince of Fürstenberg =

18th century German aristocrat

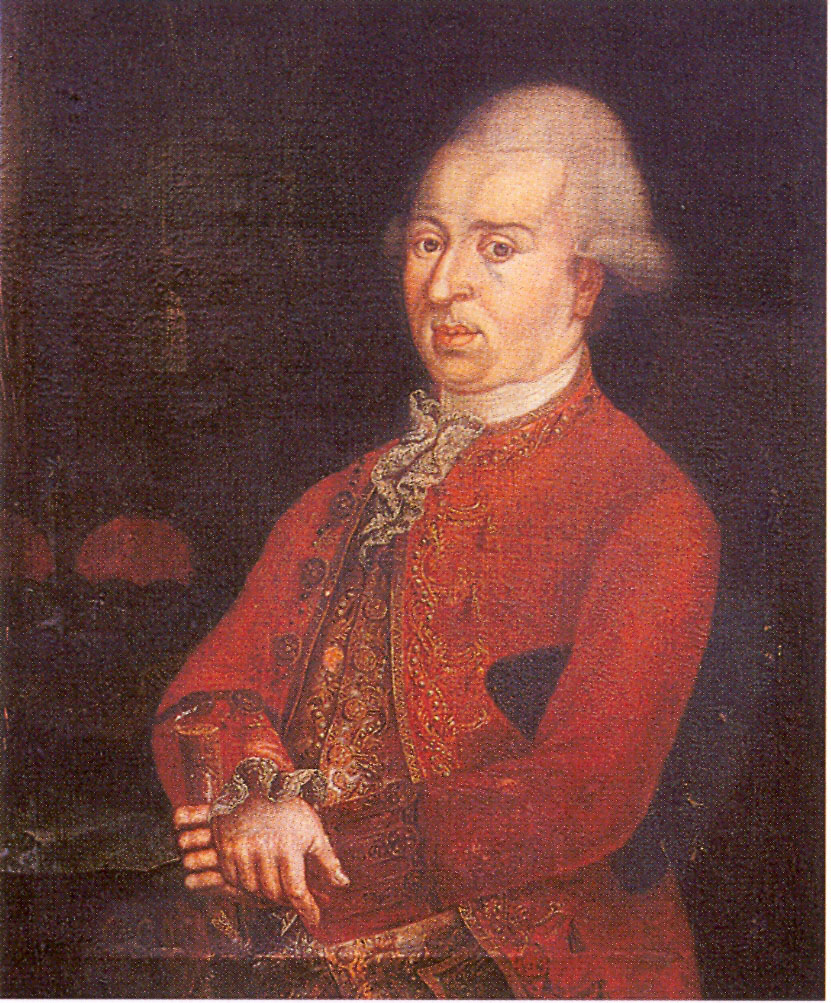
Joseph Maria Benedikt, Prince of Fürstenberg

Joseph Maria Benedikt zu Fürstenberg-Stühlingen (9 January 1758 – 24 June 1796) was a German nobleman and from 1783 until his death the seventh reigning prince of Fürstenberg. He was born in Donaueschingen, where he also died. He was the eldest son of Joseph Wenzel zu Fürstenberg and his wife Maria Josepha von Waldburg-Scheer-Trauchburg.

He married in 1778 Maria Antonia Anna of Hohenzollern-Hechingen (1760-1797), daughter of Josef Friedrich Wilhelm, Prince of Hohenzollern-Hechingen and Maria Theresia of Waldburg-Zeil zu Wurzach The marriage remained childless and he was succeeded by his younger brother Karl Joachim.

| Preceded by Joseph Wenzel | Prince of Fürstenberg; 1783 – 1796 | Succeeded by Karl Joachim |
