= Joseph Wenzel, Prince of Fürstenberg =

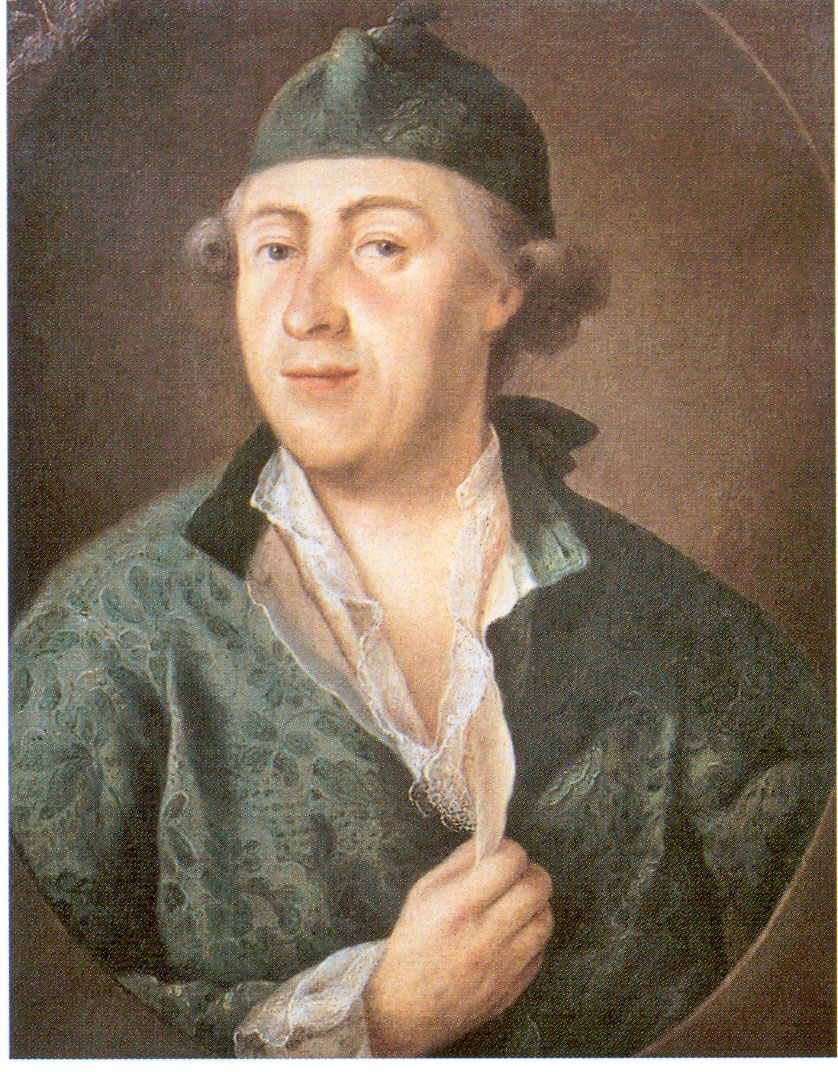
Joseph Wenzel zu Fürstenberg in 1772

Joseph Wenzel zu Fürstenberg-Stühlingen (21 March 1728 - 2 June 1783) was a German nobleman and from 1762 to 1783 the sixth ruling Prince of Fürstenberg.

== Life ==
Joseph Wenzel was the eldest son of prince Joseph zu Fürstenberg and Maria Anna von Waldstein. He studied in Straßburg and Leipzig. He tried to develop the principality's education and introduced a chancery for it. Teaching was based on the Austrian system and a Jesuit was made head of the Donaueschingen Gymnasium and later the Benedictine Franz Uebelacker was put in charge of the whole school system. He also had a history of the House of the Fürstenberg written from the principality's archives.

He set up a zuchthaus in Hüfingen and stopped his father's industrialisation policy and made resettlement difficult, since he saw industry as immoral - he preferred home handiwork such as watchmaking. In 1777 he set up a fire brigade. He was made director of the Swabian College of Reichsgrafen and in 1775 the Holy Roman Emperor appointed him a major general (with his rank effective from 1765).

He was also a music lover and was said to have been an excellent cellist. In 1762 he began building a private chapel at his court at Donaueschingen, and bringing a number of foreign musicians to man it. In 1783 he appointed Franz Christoph Neubauer as his musical director. He employed Ernst Christoph Dressler as Kapellmeister at Wetzlar between 1767 and 1771. In 1766 Leopold Mozart and his son Wolfgang Amadeus spent around two weeks at the Donaueschingen Palace as Joseph Wenzel's guest.

== Marriage and succession ==
On 9 June 1748 Joseph Wenzel married Maria Josepha, countess of Waldburg-Scheer-Trauchburg, daughter of count Hans Ernst von Waldburg-Scheer-Trauchburg. They had seven children:

- Johann Nepomuk Joseph (25 July 1755 - 6 October 1755)
- Josepha Maria Johanna (14 November 1756 - 2 October 1809) ∞ Phillip Maria von Fürstenberg-Pürglitz
- Joseph Maria (9 January 1758 – 24 June 1796)
- Maria Anna Josepha (4 April 1759 - 26 June 1759)
- Karl Alexander (11 September 1760 - 19 February 1761)
- Karl Egon (5 June 1762 - 20 February 1771)
- Karl Joachim (31 March 1771 – 17 May 1804)

== Bibliography ==
- (in German) Carl Borromäus Alois Fickler: Geschichte des Hauses und Landes Fürstenberg, Aachen und Leipzig 1832; Band 4, S. 267–280 at Google Books
- (in German) Erno Seifriz: „Des Jubels klare Welle in der Stadt der Donauquelle“. Musik am Hofe der Fürsten von Fürstenberg in Donaueschingen im 18. und 19. Jahrhundert In: Mark Hengerer und Elmar L. Kuhn (ed.): Adel im Wandel. Oberschwaben von der frühen Neuzeit bis zur Gegenwart. Verlag Thorbecke, Ostfildern 2006, ISBN 978-3-7995-0216-0, Band 1, S. 363–376.
