= Wilhelm Scheuchzer =

Swiss artist (1803–1866)

Wilhelm Scheuchzer (1803–1866) was a Swiss painter. His paintings have typical features of the romanticism movement, with extensively idealised views of the alpine landscape. He was born in Hausen am Albis and died in Munich. From 1830, he worked in Munich, often painting for Maximilian II of Bavaria.
