= Gabriel Anton, Baron Splény de Miháldy =

General (1734–1818)

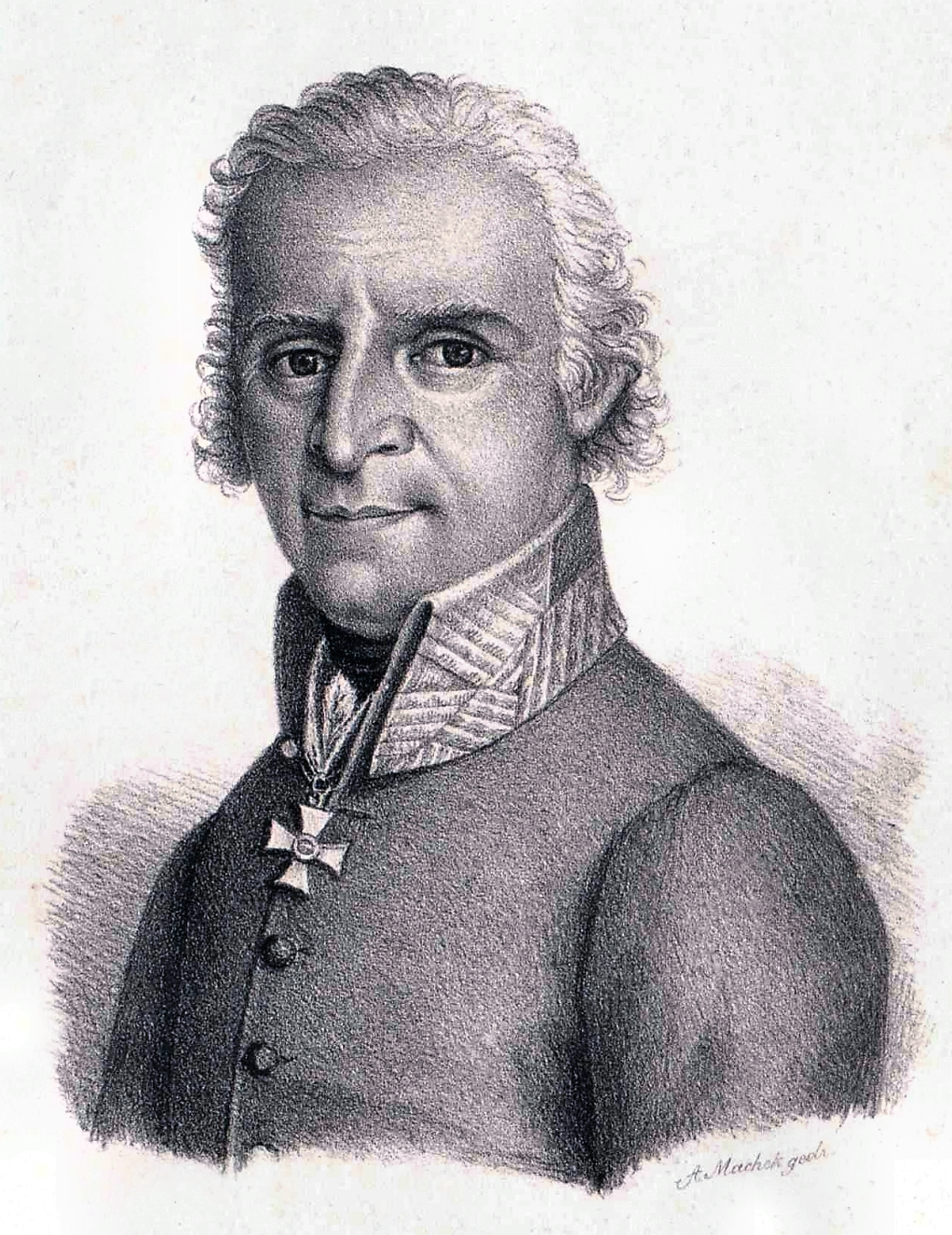

Gabriel Anton, Baron Splény de Miháldy (Ternye, Hungary, 2 October 1734 - Szilvás-Újfalu, Hungary, 1 April 1818) was a nobleman and general of the Austrian Empire during the War of the First Coalition, retiring in 1795, also the first District-Governor of Bukovina (1774-1778).
