= Karl Joachim, Prince of Fürstenberg =

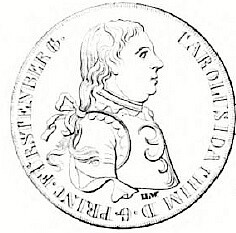
Karl Joachim

Karl Joachim Aloys Franz von Paula zu Fürstenberg-Stühlingen (31 March 1771 – 17 May 1804) was a German nobleman and member of the House of Fürstenberg. He was born and died in Donaueschingen and from 1796 to 1804 was the eighth reigning Prince of Fürstenberg.

== Life ==
Karl Joachim was the youngest son of prince Joseph Wenzel zu Fürstenberg and Maria Josepha von Waldburg-Scheer-Trauchburg. In 1787 he completed his long education with a grand tour through Belgium, Holland and England, accompanied by Joseph Kleiser.

He succeeded his elder brother Joseph Maria after the latter died childless in 1796. At the time the principality was threatened by the armies of the French First Republic and their advance over the Rhine. Karl Joachim fled to his Heiligenberg Castle, leaving government of the principality to his confident Kleiser. He pulled back the first squadron of the landsturm to advance and opposed a decision by the Swabian Reichkreis to make Donaueschingen a rendezvous point for the troops of the kreis. Karl Joachim was generally sympathetic to the French Republic and it is thought that he would have joined the Confederation of the Rhine had he lived until its foundation. Even so, the principality suffered under French occupation and from the passage of French and Austrian troops.

On 11 January 1796 Karl Joachim married Karoline Sophie von Fürstenberg-Weitra (20 August 1777 – 25 February 1846), the daughter of Joachim, Landgraf of Fürstenberg-Weitra. The marriage proved childless and the Fürstenberg-Stühlingen line died out with him - the whole of Fürstenberg thus passed to Charles Egon II of the subsidiary Bohemian line.
