= Donaueschingen =

Town in Baden-Württemberg, Germany

- Town
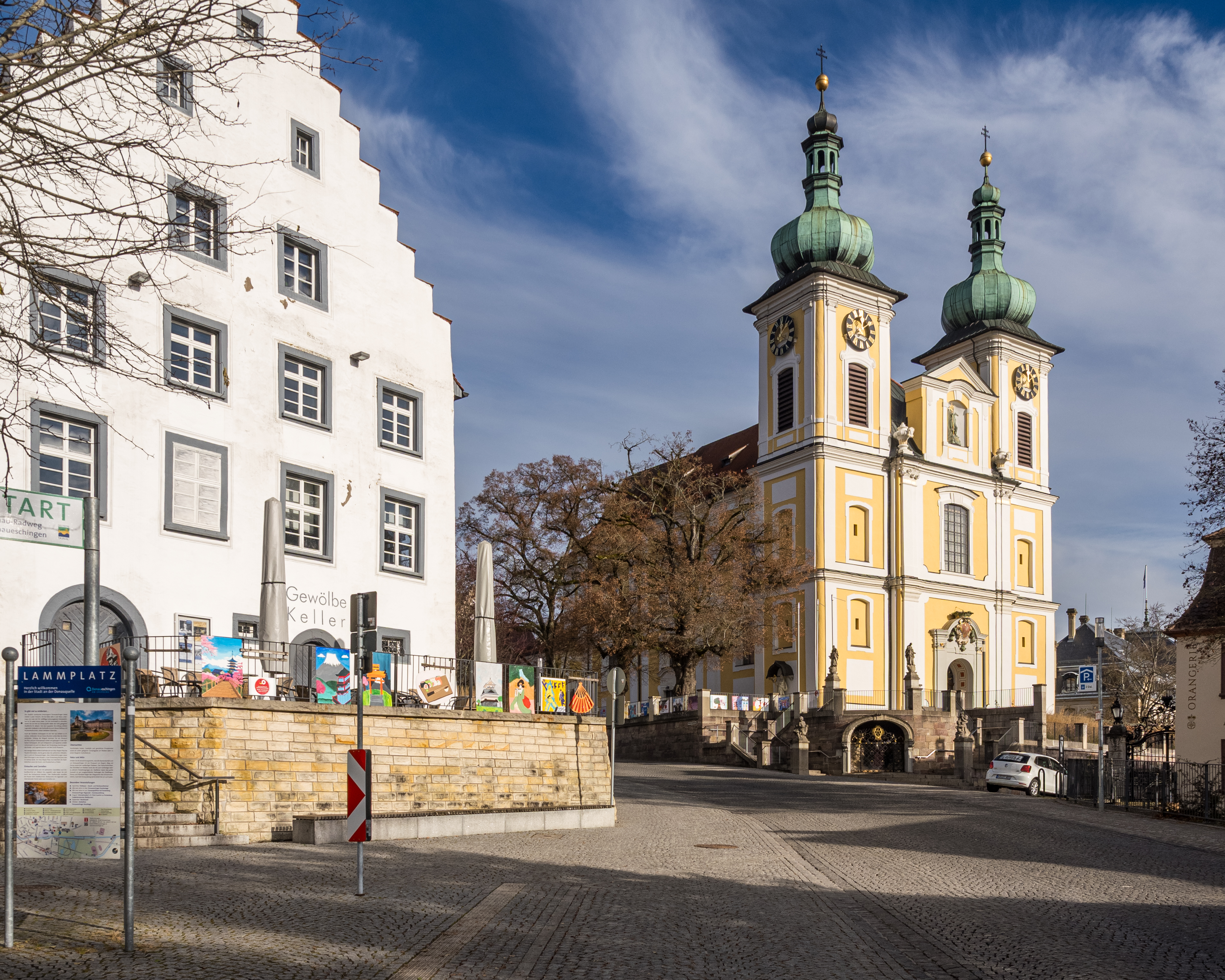
- Lammplatz square and Church of St. John

- Coat of arms

- Location of Donaueschingen within Schwarzwald-Baar-Kreis district
- Interactive map of Donaueschingen
- Location within Germany Location within Baden-Württemberg
- Coordinates: 47°57′11″N 08°30′12″E
- Country: Germany
- State: Baden-Württemberg
- Admin. region: Freiburg
- District: Schwarzwald-Baar-Kreis
- Subdivisions: Central town and 7 boroughs

Government
  - Mayor (2022–30): Erik Pauly (CDU)

Area
  - Total: 104.67 km^{2} (40.41 sq mi)
- Elevation: 686 m (2,251 ft)

Population (2025-12-31)
  - Total: 21,734
  - Density: 207.64/km^{2} (537.79/sq mi)
- Time zone: UTC+01:00 (CET)
  - Summer (DST): UTC+02:00 (CEST)
- Postal codes: 78151–78168
- Dialling codes: 0771
- Vehicle registration: VS
- Website: www.donaueschingen.de

Donaueschingen (German pronunciation: [ˌdoːnaʊˈʔɛʃɪŋən]; Low Alemannic: Eschinge) is a German town in the Black Forest in the southwest of the federal state of Baden-Württemberg in the Schwarzwald-Baar Kreis. It stands near the confluence of the two sources of the river Danube (in German: Donau).

Donaueschingen stands in a basin within low mountainous terrain. It is located about 13 km (8.1 mi) south of Villingen-Schwenningen, 24 km (15 mi) west of Tuttlingen, and about 30 km (19 mi) north of the Swiss town of Schaffhausen. In 2015 the population was 21,750, making it the second largest town in the district (Kreis) of Schwarzwald-Baar. It is a regional rail hub.

== Geography ==
Donaueschingen lies in the Baar basin in the southern Black Forest at the confluence of the Brigach and Breg rivers—the two source tributaries of the Danube—from which the town gets its name. This is today considered the true source of the Danube.

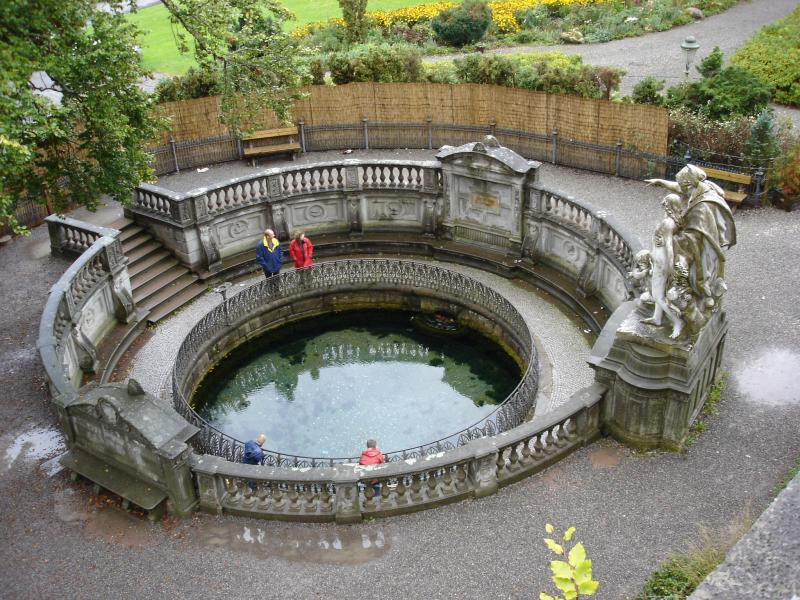
Source of the Donaubach in Donaueschingen (historically considered the source of the Danube)

An enclosed karst spring in the park of Donaueschingen Palace, the source of the "Donaubach", is known as the source of the Danube.

The municipal area extends continuously from the granite and gneiss of the Black Forest through the Triassic formations of the Schwarzwald-Baar talus to the Swabian Alb, and exhibits all strata of the southern German cuesta country. The heights decrease from 1,020 metres (3,350 ft) in the Black Forest to about 660 metres (2,170 ft) on the Baar plateau, then increase to above the 900 metres (3,000 ft) mark again at the Swabian Alb. A model showing the extraordinary geological setting of the city and its surrounding region is located in the park opposite the train station.

The town is close to Lake Titisee and less than an hour's drive from both Switzerland and France.

== History ==
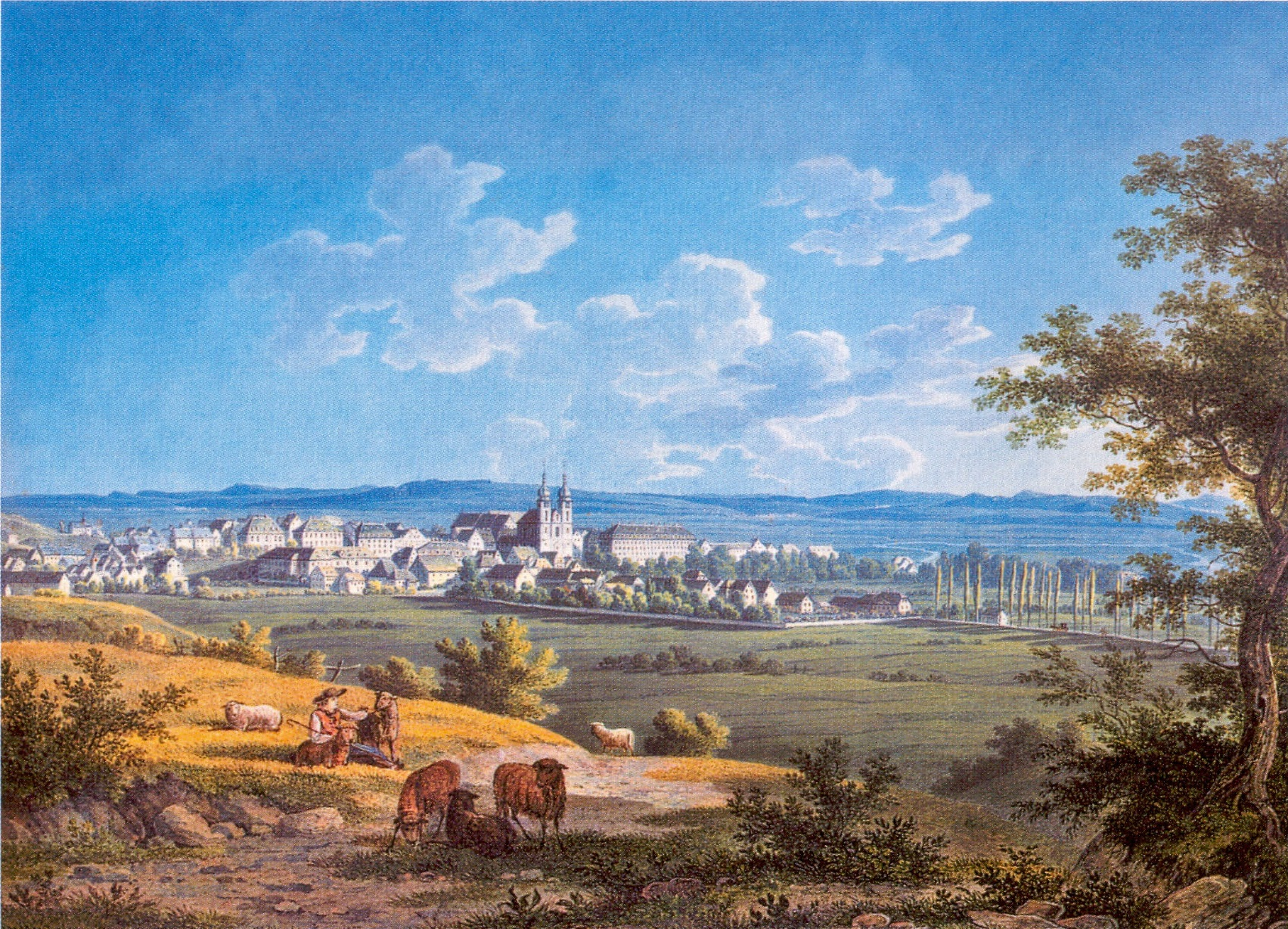
The town of Donaueschingen in 1827

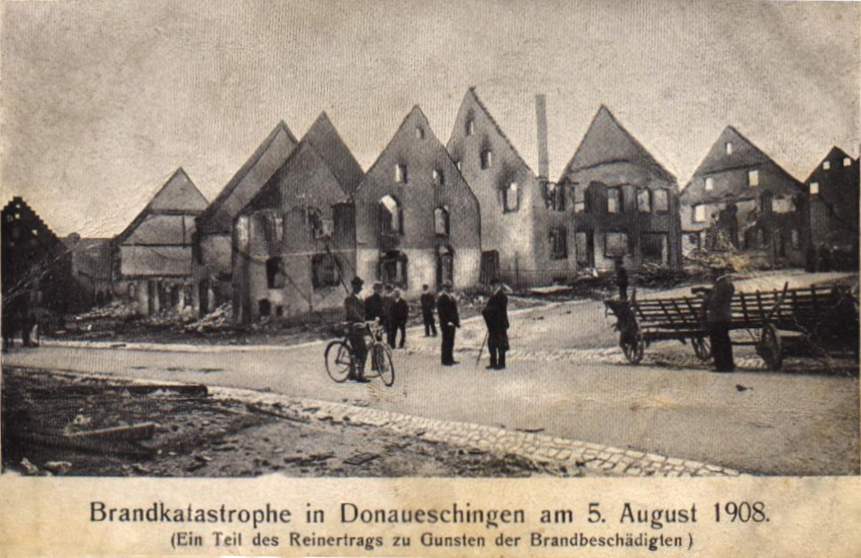
Destruction after the August 1908 fire

Donaueschingen is first recorded as Esginga in 889; the modern form of the name is first attested in 1292. In 1283, Rudolph von Habsburg granted the principality of Baar and Donaueschingen to Heinrich von Fürstenberg. The right to brew beer was also connected with this grant. This is the source of the Fürstenberg Brewery. In 1488, possession was passed to the Count of Fürstenberg-Baar. From the 18th century it was the residence of the Princes of Fürstenberg, who resided in Schloss Donaueschingen. In 1806, Donaueschingen came under the rule of the Grand Duchy of Baden and was granted township in 1810. A large part of the town was destroyed by fire in 1908. Donaueschingen has a tradition as a military garrison; from 1945 to 2014 the French military had barracks in the town, and, until the early 1990s, the U.S. Air Force operated a contingency hospital there. The hospital never received casualties on a large scale from military operations; it saw the most activity in 1989, when the United States offered the facility as temporary housing for refugees leaving from East Germany to the West.

Though the Princes of Fürstenberg were nominally mediatised and deposed as absolute ruler of the principality, they still own huge property in their former lands, including their palace with the surrounding parks and gardens. The Schlosspark (palace gardens) which used to be public and the only park accessible to the citizens of the town since 1806 recently became off-limits again. The Princes of Fürstenberg were also the owners of an important manuscript of the Nibelungenlied (Manuscript C) until they sold it in 2001. The ancestral brewery has also been sold.

== Government ==
The results of the 2019 local elections are as follows:

CDU	: 10 Seats
FDP/FW	: 8 Seats
SPD	: 5 Seats
Independents	: 5 Seats
Bündnis 90/Die Grünen	: 6 Seats

== Economy ==
The town's economy consists of nearly 1,000 various enterprises, of which 24 are medium-sized employing 2,200 people. The most important industries are machine assembly, semiconductors, injection moulding, magnetics, dyes, and shoe manufacturing.

=== Transport ===
Donaueschingen station is a regional rail hub; four rail lines join in the town. It sits on the Schwarzwaldbahn line from Offenburg to Konstanz and it is the start of the Höllentalbahn from Donaueschingen to Freiburg im Breisgau. Both of these lines are uniquely constructed because of the rough Black Forest terrain they cover. Donaueschingen is also the starting point for trains on the Danube Valley Railway (Tuttlingen–Inzigkofen railway and Ulm–Sigmaringen railway) and the Bregtalbahn, which run to Ulm and Bräunlingen respectively. The town is part of the Schwarzwald-Baar public transport system.

The town is on the A 864, a spur of the A 81 to Stuttgart. Three federal highways meet in the vicinity of Donaueschingen: the B 27 from Stuttgart to Schaffhausen; the B 31 from Freiburg im Breisgau to Lindau and the B 33 from Offenburg to Konstanz.

The long-distance Danube Cycle Trail begins in Donaueschingen and follows the course of the Danube. It is one of the best-known and longest bicycle trails in Europe.

== Education ==
The town has four secondary schools: the Fürstenberg-Gymnasium and the Wirtschaftsgymnasium, one Realschule, and one Hauptschule. There are four elementary schools associated with these schools: Eichendorffschule, Erich-Kästner-Schule, Grundschule Pfohren, and the Grundschule Wolterdingen. There are two special-needs schools: the Heinrich-Feuerstein-Schule and the Karl-Wacker-Schule.

There are two professional training schools: the Donaueschingen Commercial School and the Business and Home Economics Schools. There is also the Nursing College and the College for Agriculture. The Academy for Further Education and Personal Development is located in the former district hospital.

== Culture ==
The Donaueschingen Festival for contemporary music ("Donaueschinger Musiktage"), founded in 1921 and one of the world's oldest festivals for new music, takes place every year in October. Guest composers have included Paul Hindemith, Arnold Schoenberg, Pierre Boulez, Elliott Carter, John Cage, and György Ligeti.

The Fürstenberg Library in Donaueschingen holds early copies of five of Mozart's operas, which have been an important source in reviving historically informed performances of 18th-century opera.

Donaueschingen is home to the Museum Art.Plus, a contemporary art museum established in 2009.

== Twin towns – sister cities ==
Donaueschingen is twinned with:

- Kaminoyama, Japan (1995)
- Saverne, France (1964)
- Vác, Hungary (1993)

== Notable people ==
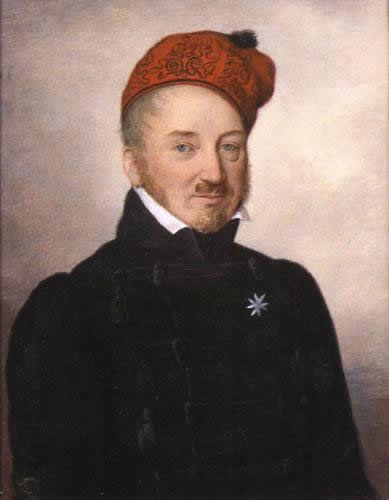
Joseph von Laßberg

- Jan Kalivoda (1801–1866), composer, and violinist of Bohemian birth conducted locally from 1822 to 1865.
- Anselm Kiefer (born 1945), painter and sculptor
- Eugen Meindl (1892–1951), paratroop general in the Luftwaffe during WW II.
- Wolf-Dieter Bensinger (1907–1974), engineer, helped develop the Wankel rotary engine.
- Gerd Spittler (born 1939), ethnologist and sociologist, emeritus University of Bayreuth
- Ali Güneş (born 1978), former footballer who played 246 games and one for Turkey

=== Aristocracy ===
- Charles the Fat (839–888), Emperor of the Carolingian Empire from 881 to 887.
- Joseph Maria, Prince of Fürstenberg (1758–1796), reigning prince of Fürstenberg from 1783
- Joseph von Laßberg (1770-1855), antiquary.
- Karl Joachim, Prince of Fürstenberg (1771–1804), reigning prince of Fürstenberg from 1796
- Charles Egon III, Prince of Fürstenberg (1820–1892), Cavalry General.
- Countess Beatrice von Hardenberg (1947–2020), former Duchess of Seville

== Gallery ==
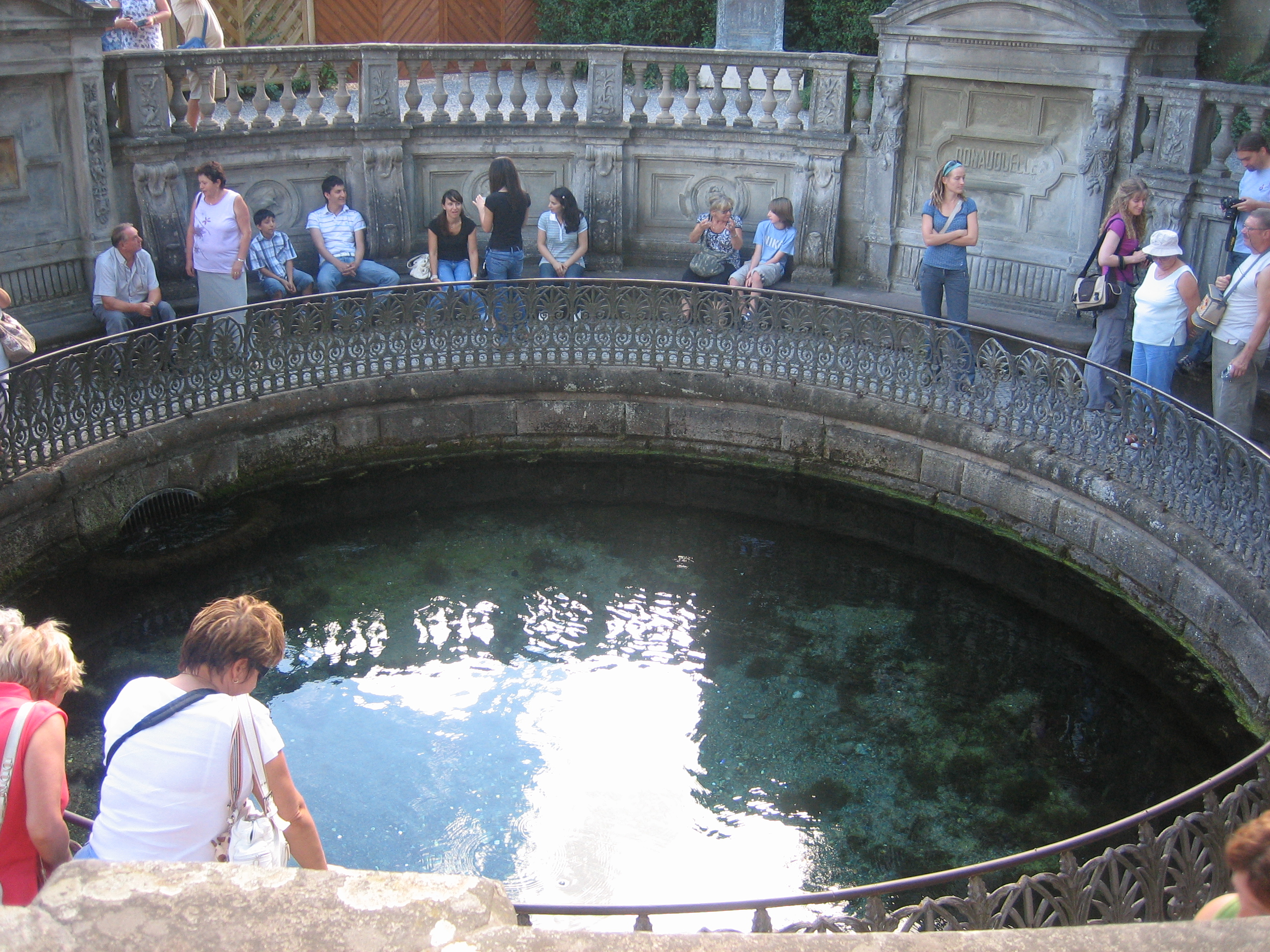

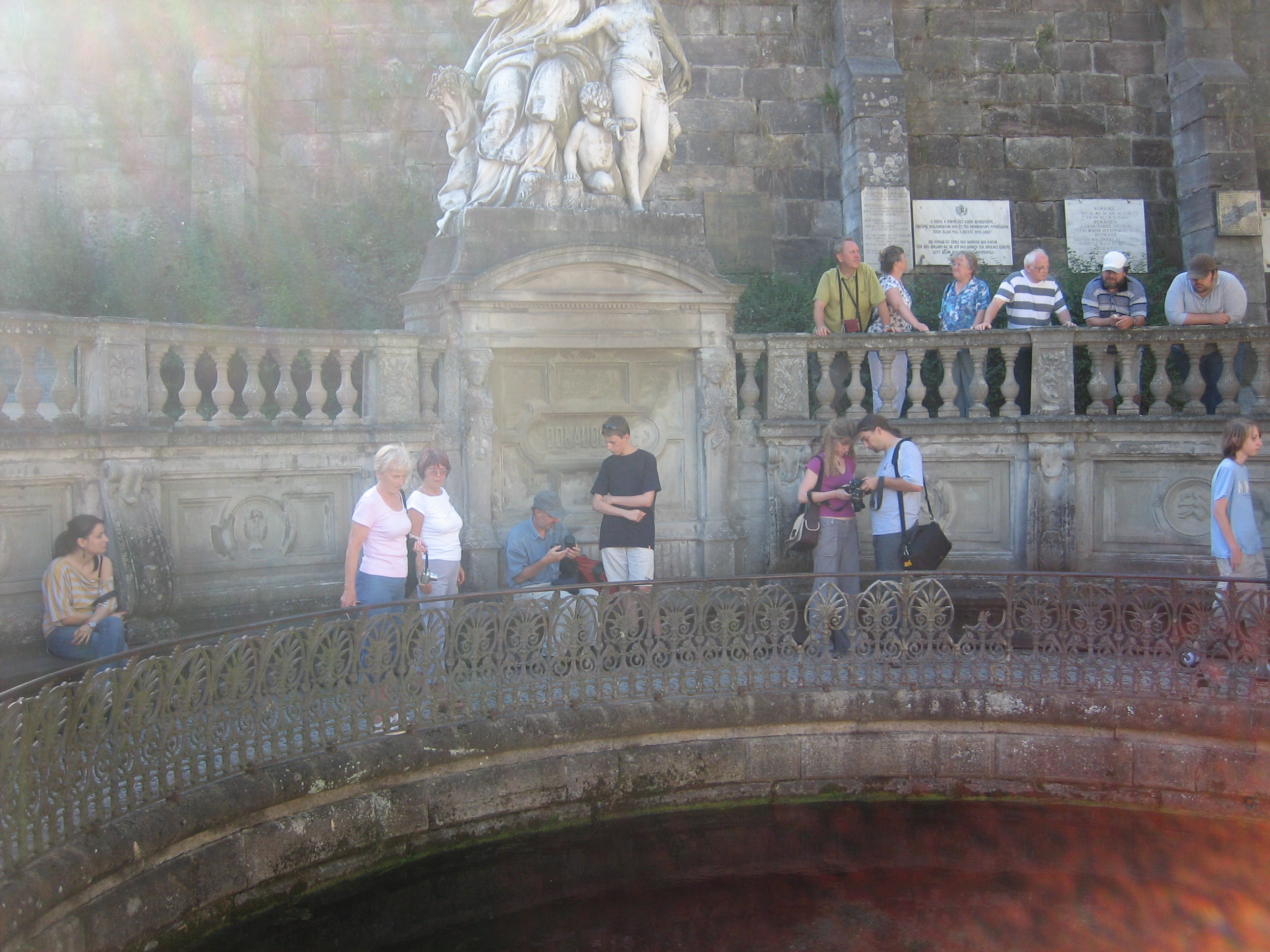

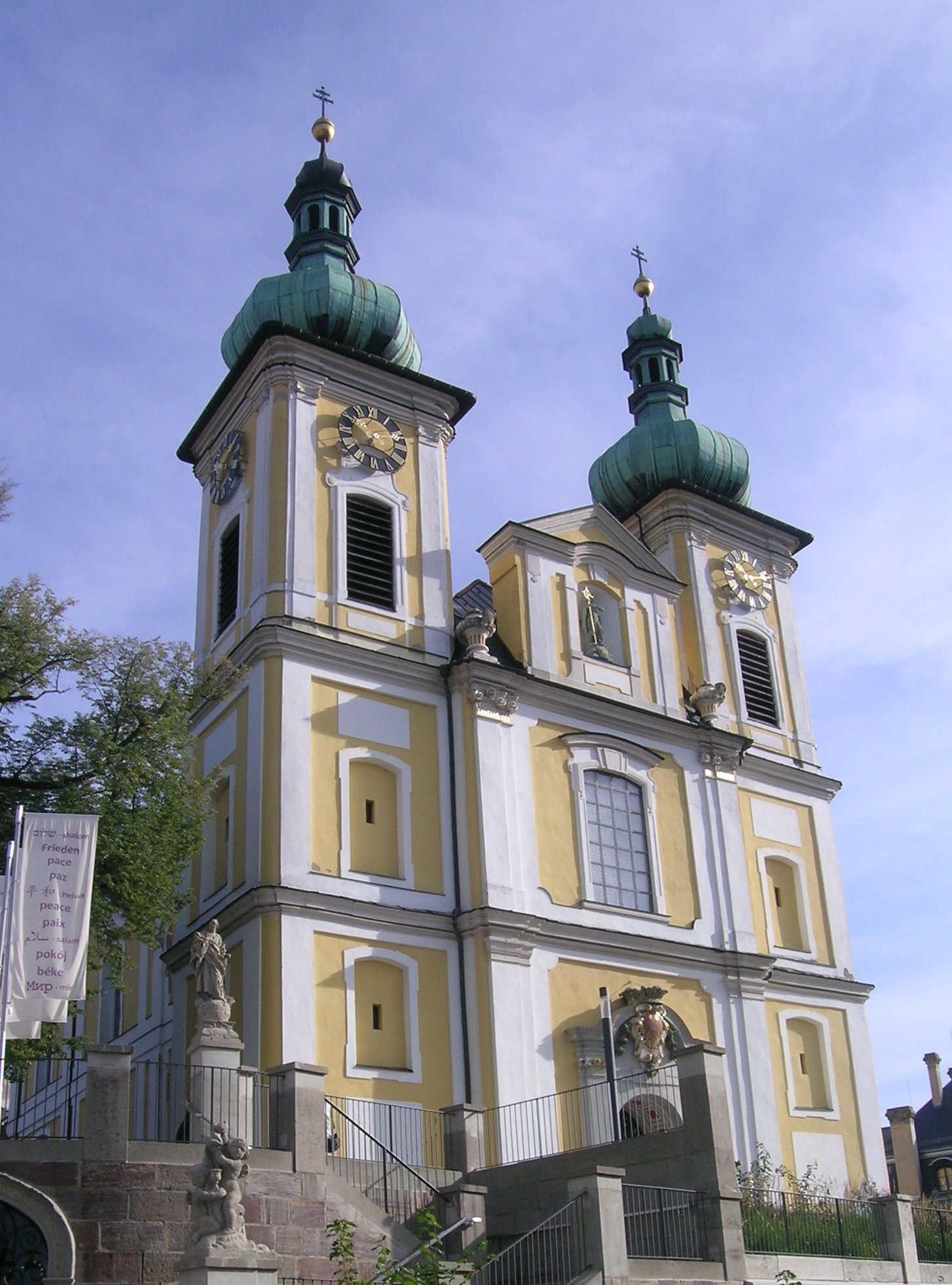

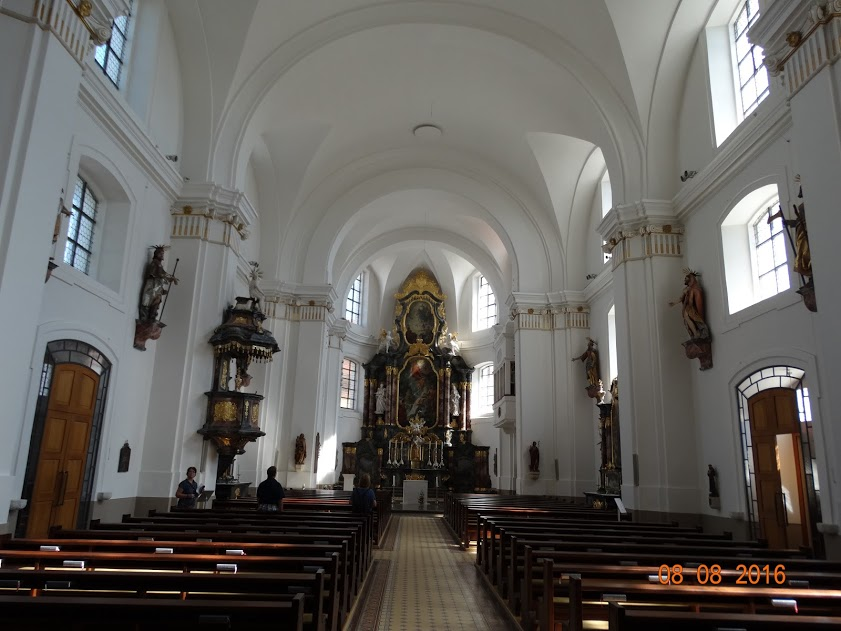
