= Maximilian II =

Maximilian II may refer to:

- Maximilian II, Holy Roman Emperor (1527–1576)
- Maximilian II Emanuel, Elector of Bavaria (1662–1726)
- Maximilian II of Bavaria (1811–1864)

== See also ==
- Maximilian Egon II, Prince of Fürstenberg (1863–1941)
