= Charles Egon V, Prince of Fürstenberg =

Charles Egon V
- Prince of Fürstenberg
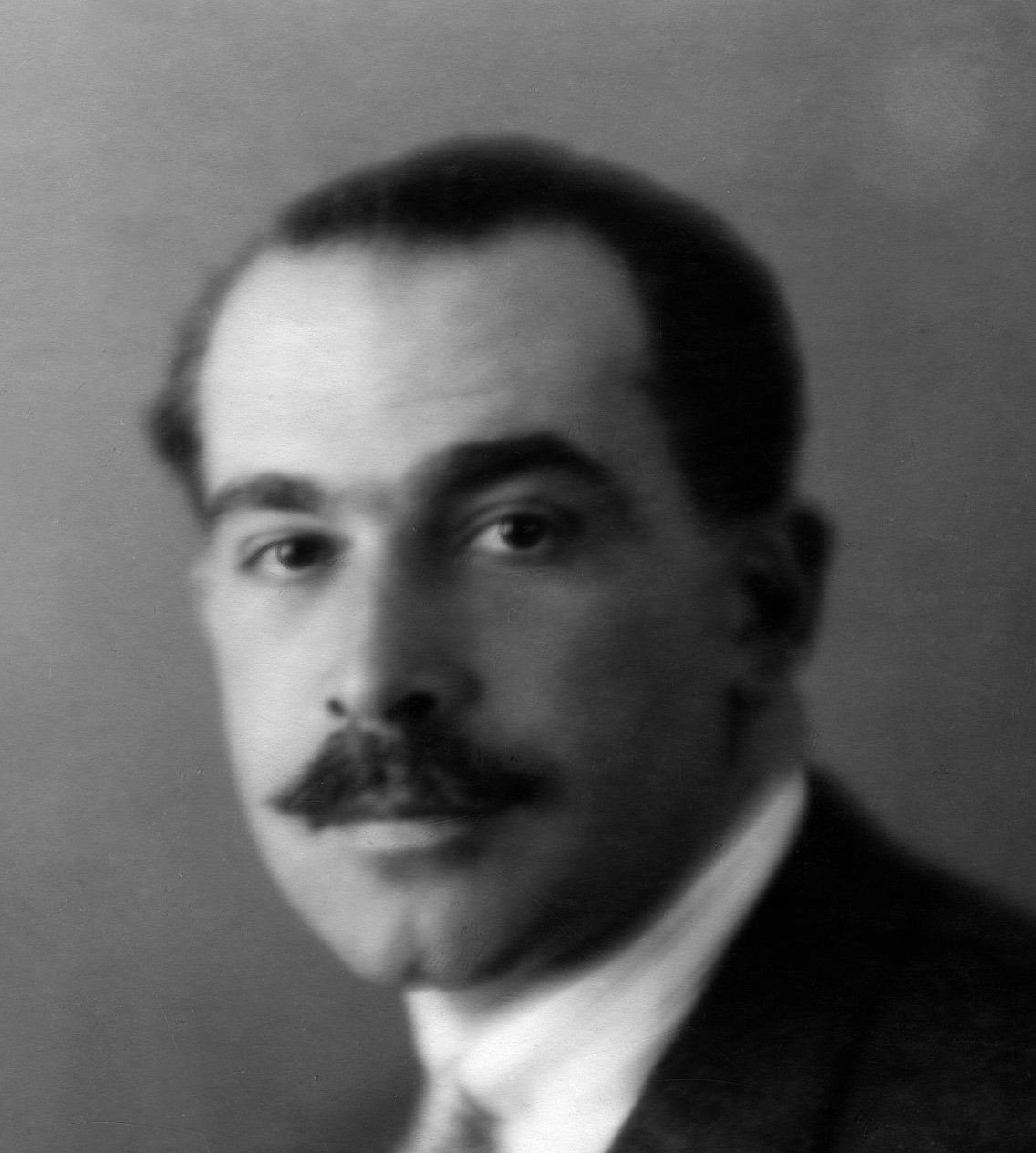
- Photograph of Charles Egon V, by Karl Schrecker, 1927

Head of the House of Fürstenberg
- Tenure: 1941–1973
- Predecessor: Max Egon II
- Successor: Joachim Egon
- Born: 6 May 1891; Vienna, Austria-Hungary
- Died: 23 September 1973 (aged 82); Munich, Germany
- Spouse: Countess Franziska Ida von Nostitz-Rieneck (m. 1921; died 1961)
- House: Fürstenberg
- Father: Maximilian Egon II, Prince of Fürstenberg
- Mother: Countess Irma von Schönborn-Buchheim

Charles Egon V, Prince of Fürstenberg (6 May 1891 – 23 September 1973) was a German landowner, investor and nobleman who was the head of the House of Fürstenberg from 1941 to 1973.

== Early life ==
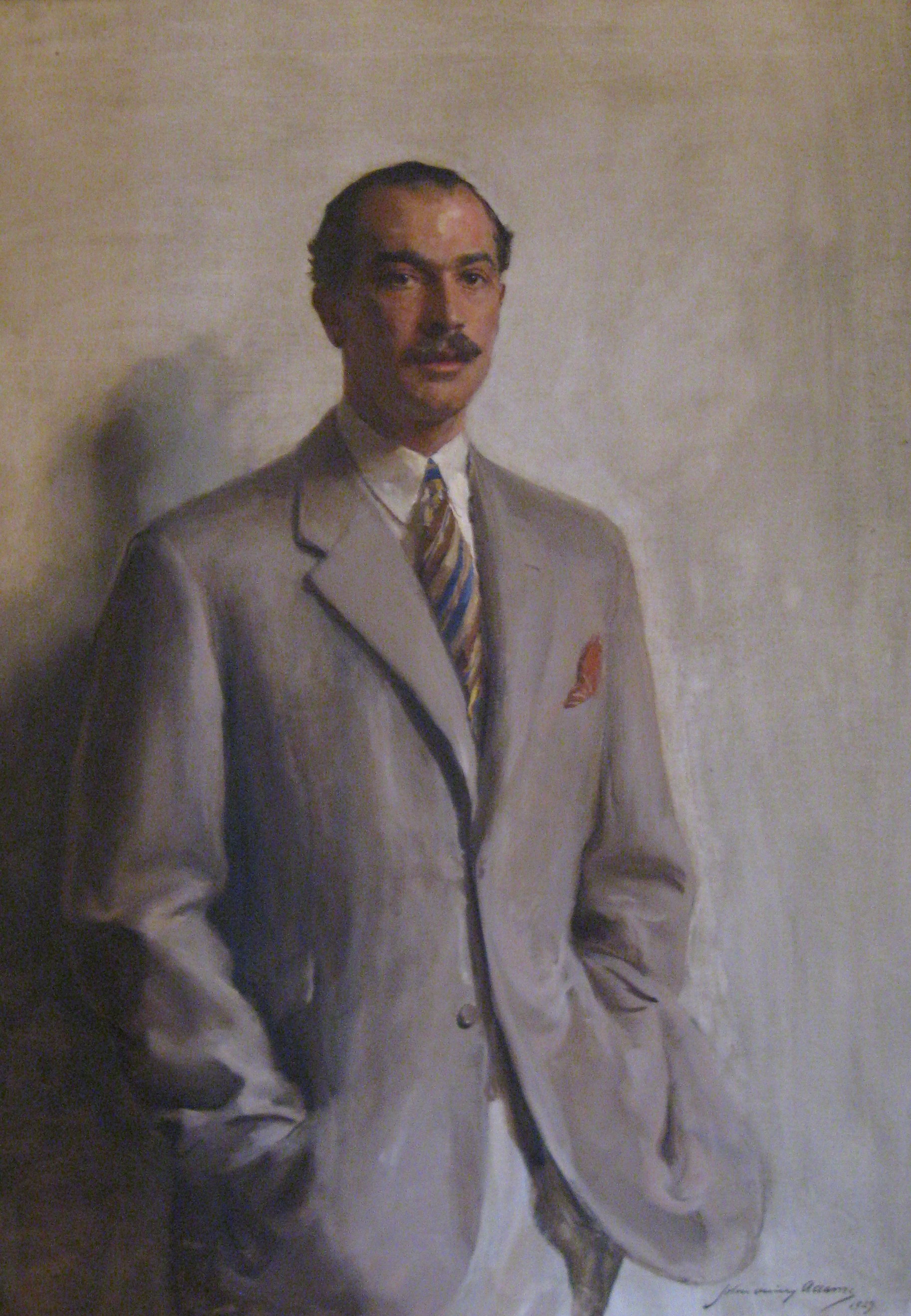
Portrait of the Prince, by John Quincy Adams, 1929

Fürstenberg was born on 6 May 1891 in Vienna. He was the eldest child of Maximilian Egon II, Prince of Fürstenberg and Countess Irma von Schönborn-Buchheim. From his parents' marriage, he had four younger siblings, Princess Leontina of Fürstenberg (who married Hugo, 4th Prince of Windisch-Graetz), Princess Anna of Fürstenberg (who married Franz, 8th Prince of Khevenhüller-Metsch), Prince Maximilian Egon of Fürstenberg (who married Countess Wilhelmine von Schönburg-Glauchau), and Prince Friedrich Eduard of Fürstenberg (who was killed in action during World War I).

His paternal grandparents were Prince Maximilian Egon I of Fürstenberg and Countess Leontina von Khevenhüller-Metsch (a daughter of Richard, 5th Prince of Khevenhüller-Metsch). His maternal grandparents were Erwein, 4th Count of Schönborn-Buchheim, and Countess Franziska von Trauttmansdorff-Weinsberg.

== Career ==
Upon the death of his father on 11 August 1941, he succeeded as the Head of the House of Fürstenberg. While he became the nominal head, he renounced his succession right to the Swabian properties of his father in favor of his brother's children. While his father chose to live at Donaueschingen Palace, where he often entertained his close friend Emperor Wilhelm II, Charles Egon V chose to live at Heiligenberg Castle on Lake Constance and at Weitra Castle in Lower Austria.

Fürstenberg was made an honorary citizen of Heiligenberg and Weitra. He was also Grand Commander of the Order of St. George in Bavaria and holder of the Grand Cross of the Order of Malta.

=== Military career ===
During World War I as a A former lieutenant of the Prussian Garde du Corps (Potsdam) and received the Iron Cross, 2nd Class.

On 11 September 1938 during World War II, Prince Karl Egon V joined the SS, the paramilitary organization of the Nazi Party in Nazi Germany, and throughout German-occupied Europe. He was appointed SS-Obersturmführer in 1939. He applied for admission to the NSDAP on 20 June 1938 and was admitted on 1 January 1941. He became a Major in the Wehrmacht in 1943. After the war, he lived mainly in Vienna and at his castles in Heiligenberg and Weitra.

== Personal life ==
On 26 April 1921, Fürstenberg married Countess Franziska Ida "Mena" von Nostitz-Rieneck (1902–1961), a daughter of Count Erwin Felix Maria von Nostitz-Rieneck and Amalia Podstatzky-Liechtenstein (a daughter of Leopold Podstatzky-Liechtenstein).

His wife died in Munich on 20 May 1961. The Prince died, also in Munich, on 23 September 1973 and was buried in the Fürstenberg family crypt in Altweitra, Lower Austria. As he had no children, he was succeeded by his nephew, Joachim Egon.

== Honours and awards ==
- Order of St. George: Grand Commander
- Sovereign Military Order of Malta: Grand Cross
