= Elisabeth of Fürstenburg =

The Princess of Fürstenburg
- Princess of Fürstenburg
- Predecessor: As Princess: Anna Maria of Hohenzollern-Hechingen
- Other names: The Princess of Fürstenburg
- Born: Elisabeth; 1621
- Died: 1662 (aged 40–41)
- Issue: Ferdinand Gobert of Aspremont-Lynden; Anna Maria of Lynden; Maria Ernestine of Lynden
- Father: Egon of Furstenburg
- Mother: Anna Maria of Hohenzollern-Hechingen

Elisabeth of Furstenburg was the princess of Fürstenburg.

In 1643 she married Ferdinand Egon Friedrich of Fürstenberg (1623–1662), who was the son of Egon VIII of Fürstenberg-Heiligenberg.
