= Catherine von Fürstenberg-Dussmann =

American actress

- Born: Catherine von Fürstenberg; January 26, 1951 (age 74); St. Louis, Missouri, U.S.
- Education: Regis University (BA)
- Occupation(s): Actress, designer, businesswoman
- Employer: Dussmann Group
- Spouse: Peter Dussman (m. 1980; died 2013)
- Children: 1

Catherine von Fürstenberg-Dussmann (born January 26, 1951) is an American actress, designer, and businesswoman. Since 2011, she has been chair of the board of trustees of the Dussman Group.

== Early life and education ==
von Fürstenberg-Dussmann was born in St. Louis, Missouri, one of seven children of a wealthy lawyer. She was raised Catholic. She is a descendant of a member of the Fürstenberg aristocratic family who emigrated to the United States in 1847.

After studying literature and psychology from 1969 to 1973 at Regis University in Denver, von Fürstenberg-Dussmann was a member of the drama studios of the Royal Academy of Dramatic Art in London from 1973 to 1974.

== Career ==
von Fürstenberg-Dussmann began her career as an actress and model in Los Angeles. She appeared in a 1977 episode of What's Happening!!. She also started her own interior design business. Fürstenberg-Dussmann joined the supervisory board of the Berlin-based company Dussmann Group, founded by her husband in 1963, with over 60,000 employees worldwide. In April 2009, she took over the management of the supervisory board. At the beginning of 2011, she reorganized the top management. The supervisory board was replaced by a board of trustees in Berlin, which she has headed ever since.

== Personal life ==
In 1980, von Fürstenberg-Dussmann married the entrepreneur Peter Dussmann. The couple had one daughter. von Fürstenberg-Dussmann often spends time on the family estate in southern Germany. Fürstenberg-Dussmann's husband suffered a stroke in 2008 and died in 2013.
