= House of Fürstenberg (Swabia) =

Swabian noble house in Germany

- Country: Holy Roman Empire; Germany
- Current region: Swabia
- Etymology: Fürstenberg Castle
- Founded: circa 1250
- Founder: Count Henry of Urach
- Current head: Christian, Fürst zu Fürstenberg
- Final ruler: Karl Egon II
- Seat: Donaueschingen Palace
- Titles: Fürst zu Fürstenberg; Prince of Fürstenberg; Landgrave of Fürstenberg-Weitra; Count of Fürstenberg
- Deposition: 1806 (Mediatised to Baden, Hohenzollern-Sigmaringen and Württemberg

The House of Fürstenberg (German pronunciation: [ˈfʏʁstn̩ˌbɛʁk]; Fürstenhaus zu Fürstenberg) is an old and influential Swabian noble family in Germany, based primarily in what is today southern Baden-Württemberg near the source of the Danube river. Numerous members of the family have risen to prominence over the centuries as soldiers, churchmen, diplomats, and academics. Sometimes the name is transcribed as von Fürstenberg, gallicized as de Furstenberg or anglicized as Furstenberg.

== History ==
Fürstenberg was a county of the Holy Roman Empire in Swabia, present-day southern Baden-Württemberg, Germany. The county emerged when Count Egino IV of Urach inherited through marriage large parts of the Duchy of Zähringen upon the death of Duke Berthold V in 1218, and was originally called the county of Freiburg. Egino's grandson Count Henry began to take as his surname the name of his residence at Fürstenberg Castle around 1250.

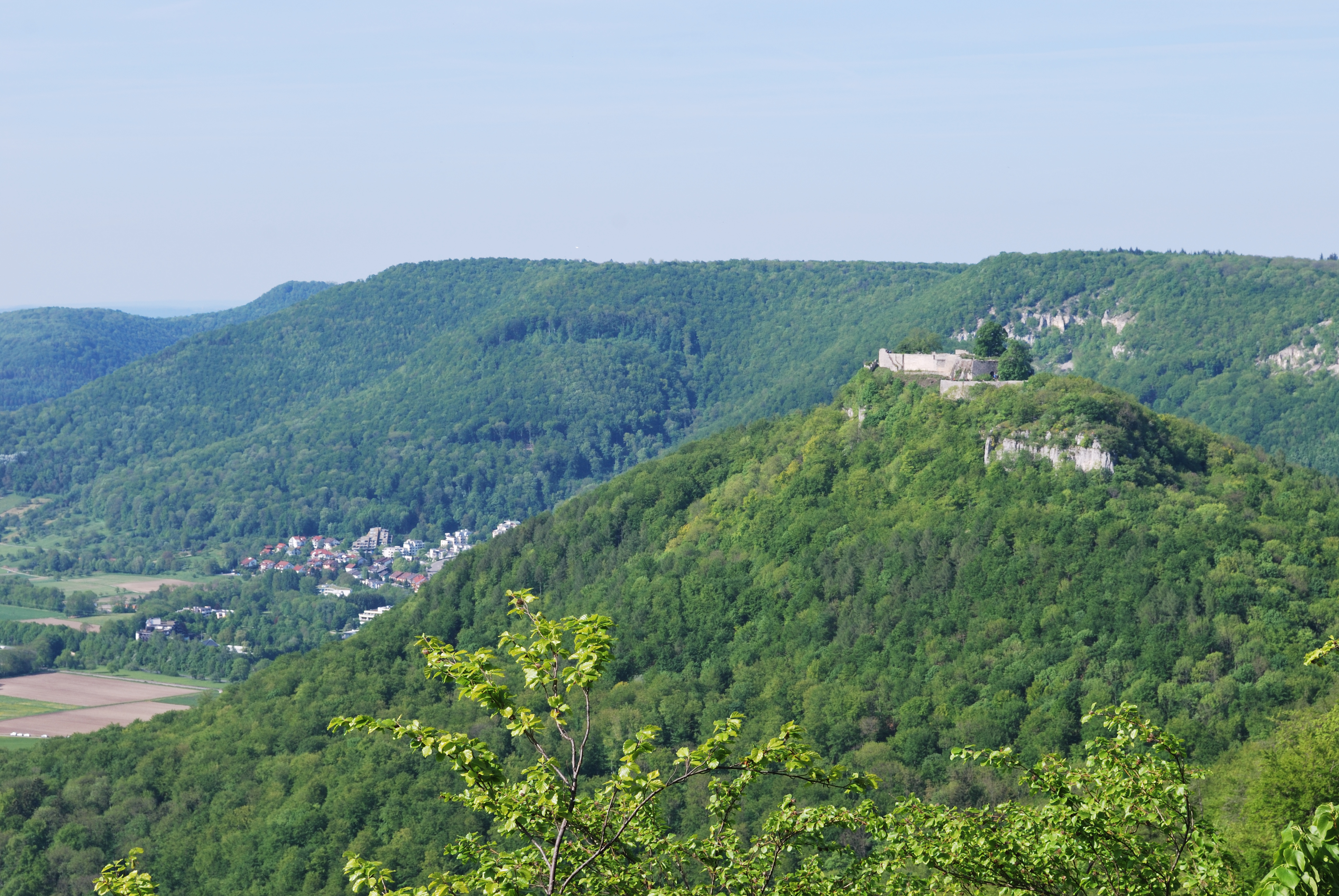
Urach Castle

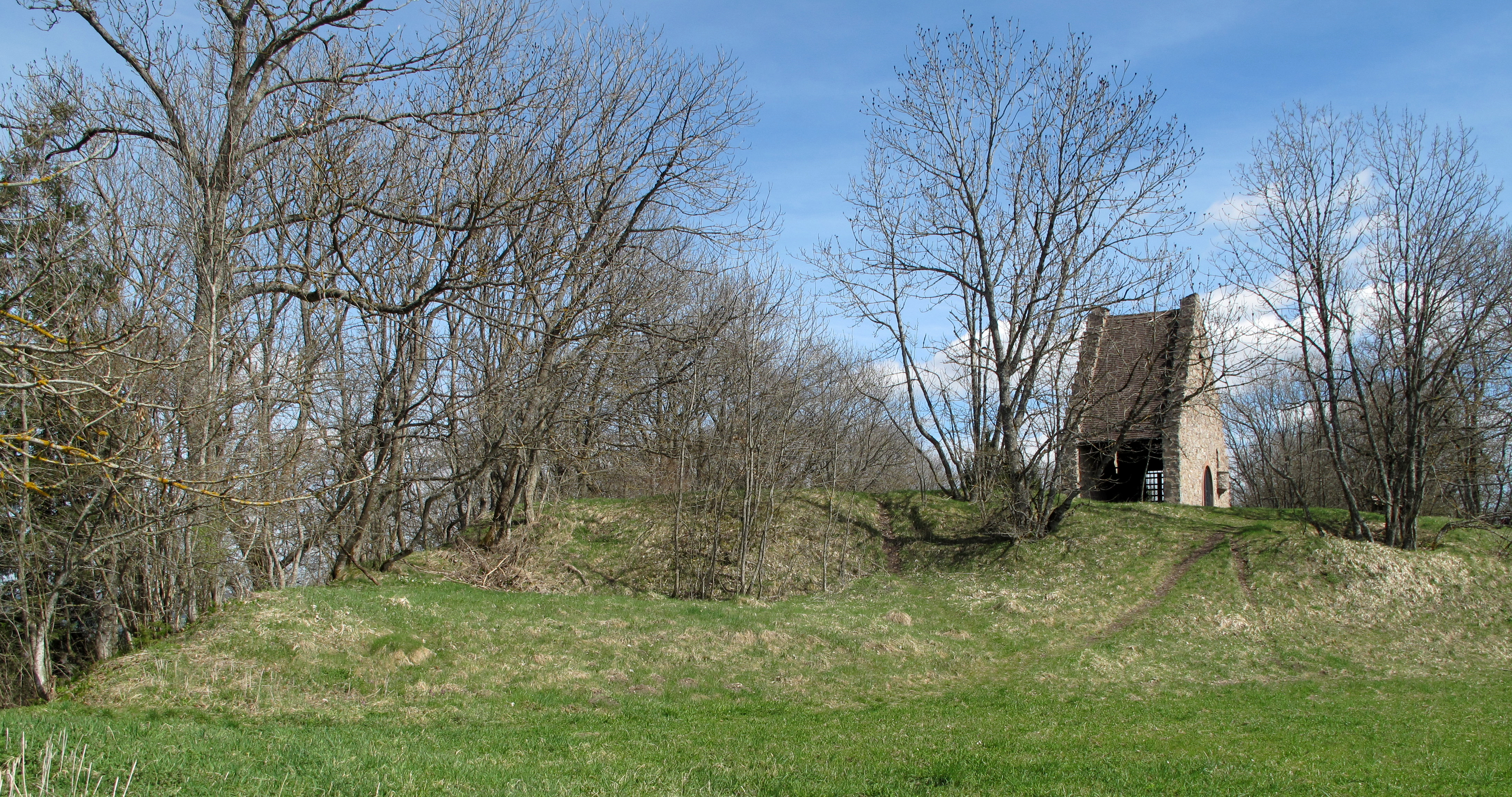
Land works of the former Fürstenberg Castle

The county was partitioned in 1284 between itself and the lower county of Villingen, and then again in 1408 between Fürstenberg-Fürstenberg and Fürstenberg-Wolfach. Over the centuries, the various counts and Princes expanded their territories to include the Landgraviate of Baar, the County of Heiligenberg, the Lordships of Gundelfingen, Hausen, Höwen, and Meßkirch, and the Landgraviate of Stühlingen in Germany; as well as estates around Křivoklát Castle (German: Pürglitz), Bohemia, Tavíkovice Castle (German: Taikowitz) in Moravia, and from 1733 Lány Castle in Bohemia.

In 1607, Count Frederick IV of Fürstenberg-Heiligenberg acquired the fief of Weitra in Lower Austria by marriage. The House of Fürstenberg held Weitra until the Revolutions of 1848. The members of the Fürstenberg-Weitra cadet branch built a Renaissance castle on medieval foundations.

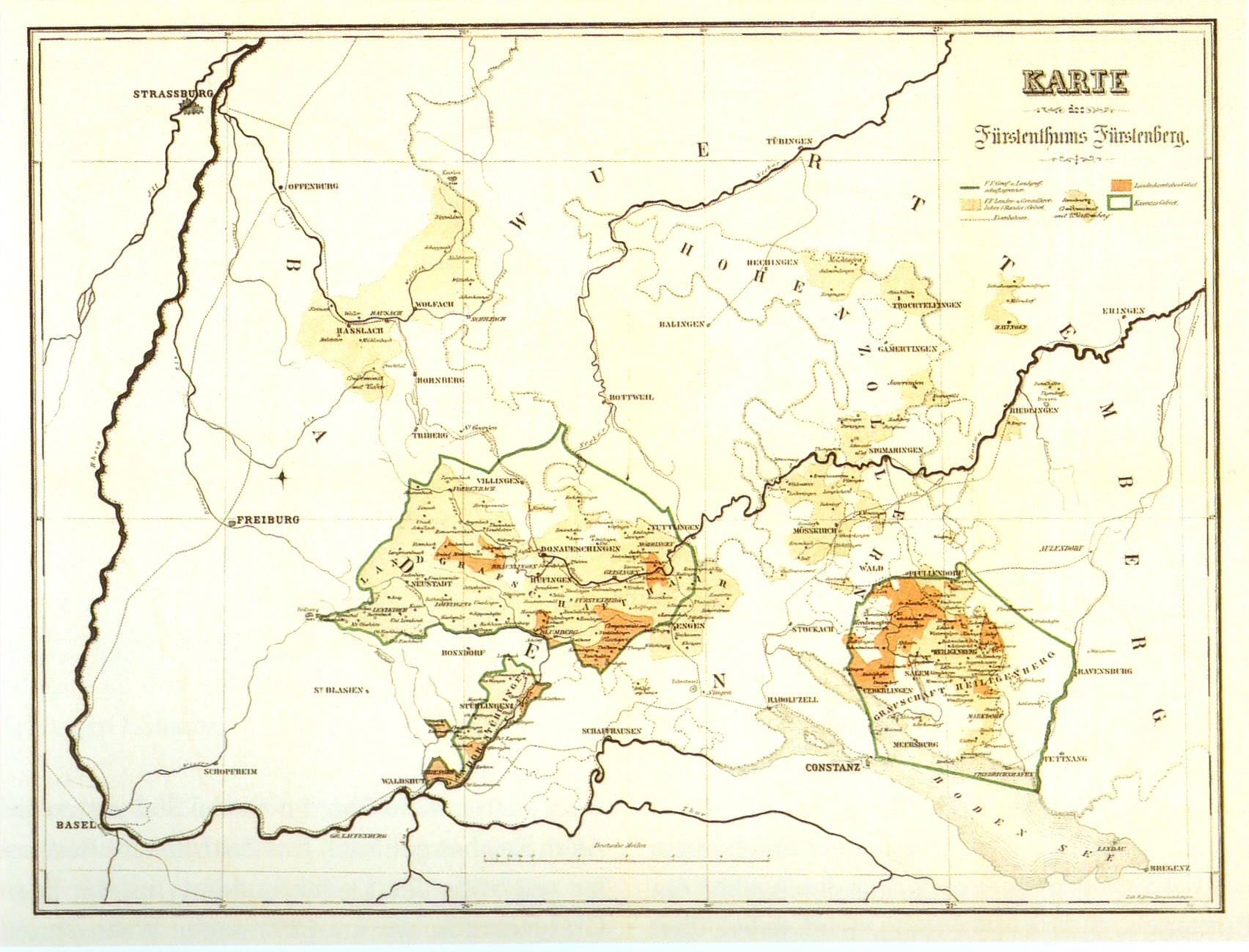
The principality of Fürstenberg, composed of the counties of Baar, Stühlingen and Heiligenberg, c. 1800

In 1664, Count Hermann Egon of Fürstenberg-Heiligenberg and his brothers, the bishops Franz Egon of Strasbourg and Cardinal Wilhelm Egon von Fürstenberg, became Princes of the Holy Roman Empire. In 1667, the county of Fürstenberg-Heiligenberg was formally raised to a principality and received a vote in the Imperial Diet. After the Fürstenberg-Heiligenberg branch of the family became extinct in 1716, the counts Froben Ferdinand of Fürstenberg-Messkirch and Joseph Wilhelm Ernst of Fürstenberg-Stühlingen became princes of the Holy Roman Empire.

In 1744, various Fürstenberg territories were reunified to the Principality of Fürstenberg-Fürstenberg, as all lines except one had become extinct. Between 1664 and 1716 the residence had been Heiligenberg. The residences of the two partial principalities between 1716 and 1723 were Stühlingen and Meßkirch. In 1723 Prince Joseph of Fürstenberg-Stühlingen built his new residence at Donaueschingen, being more centrally located, which remained the residence of the united principality after the Meßkirch branch of the family had become extinct.

The Rheinbundakte of 1806 dissolved Fürstenberg. Most of its territory was given to the Grand Duchy of Baden; smaller parts were given to the Kingdom of Württemberg, the principality of Hohenzollern-Sigmaringen and the Kingdom of Bavaria.

The princely family still resides today at Donaueschingen, Heiligenberg and Weitra.

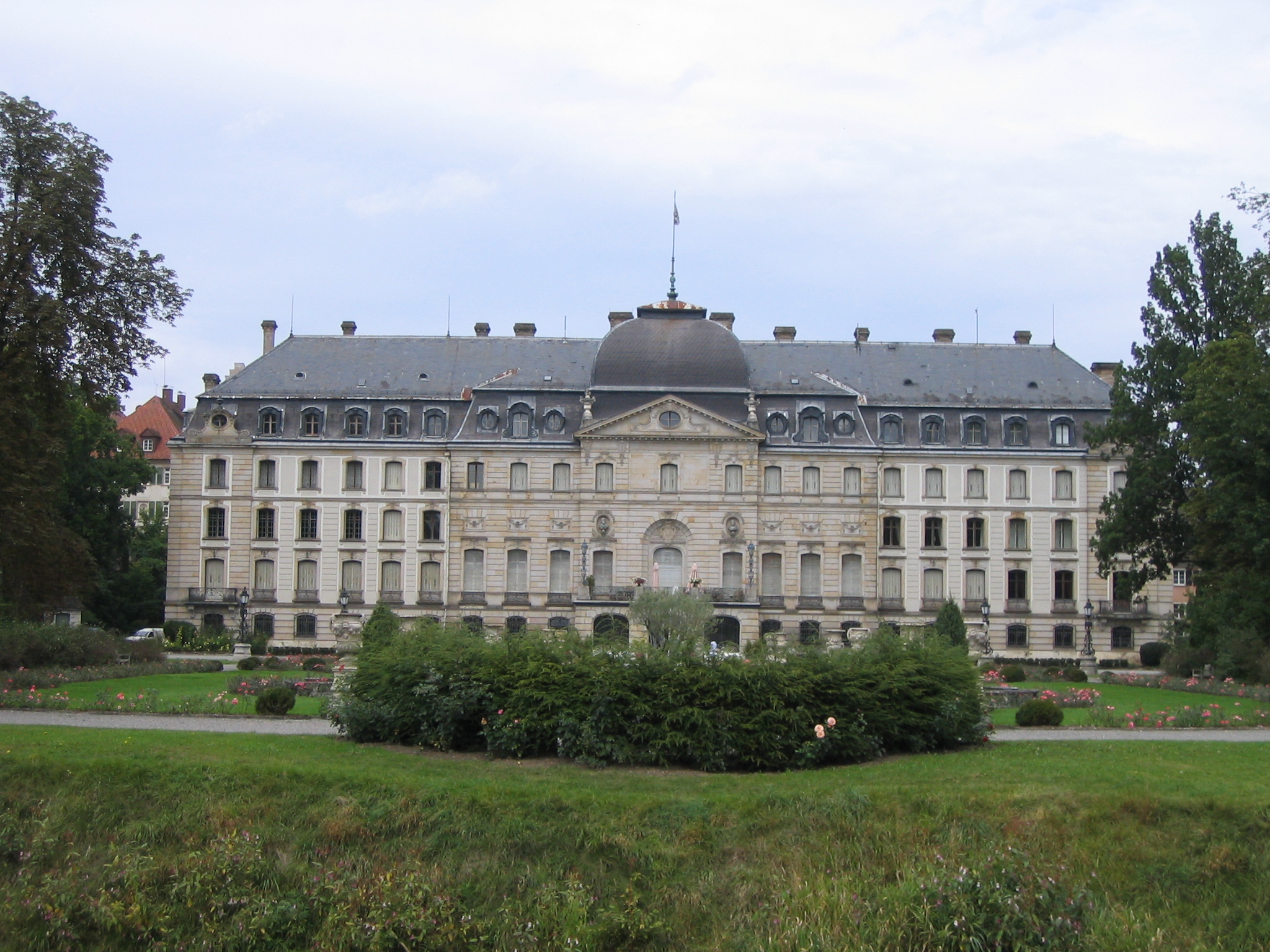
The Princely Palace in Donaueschingen

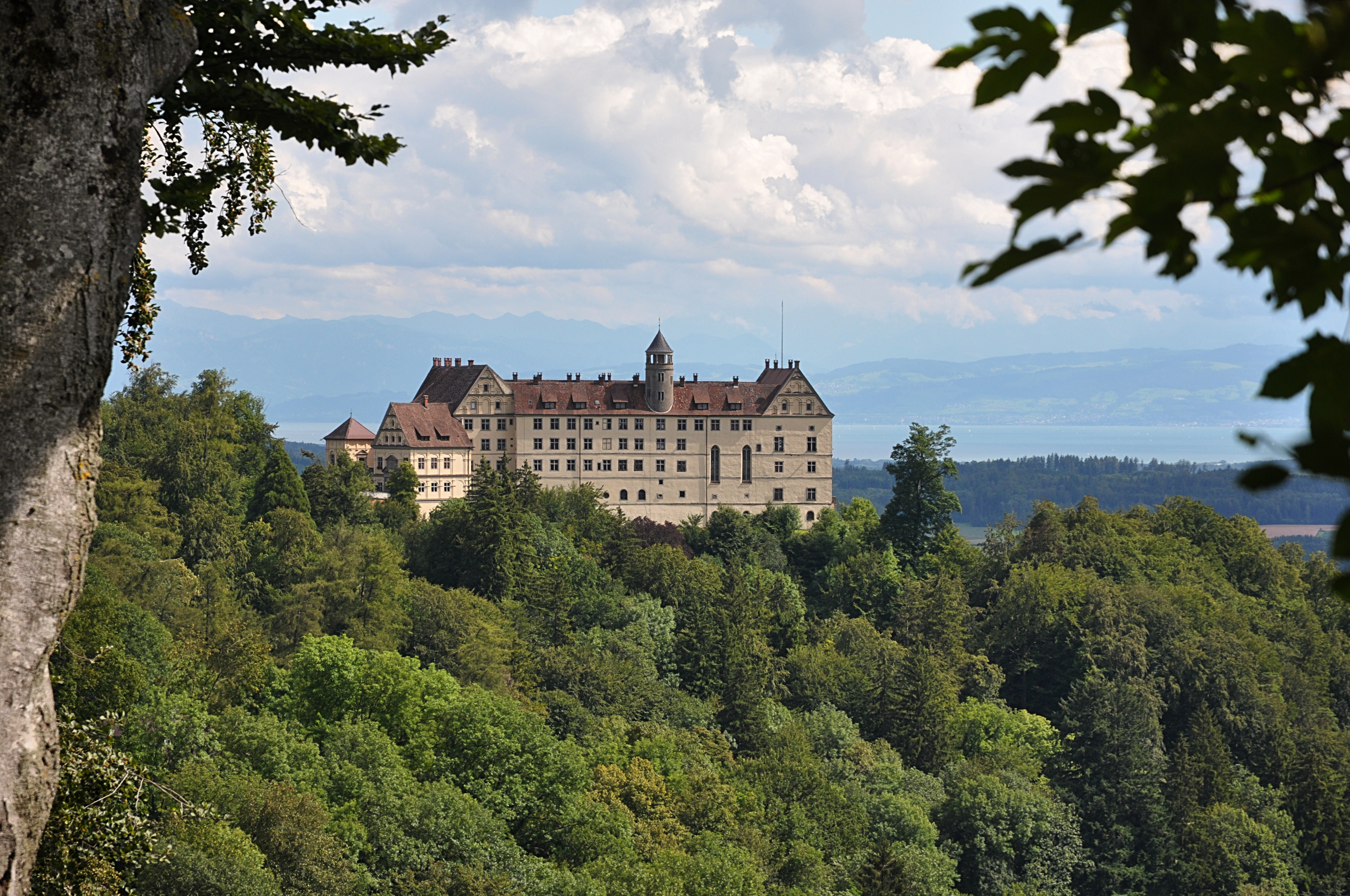
Schloss Heiligenberg, Germany

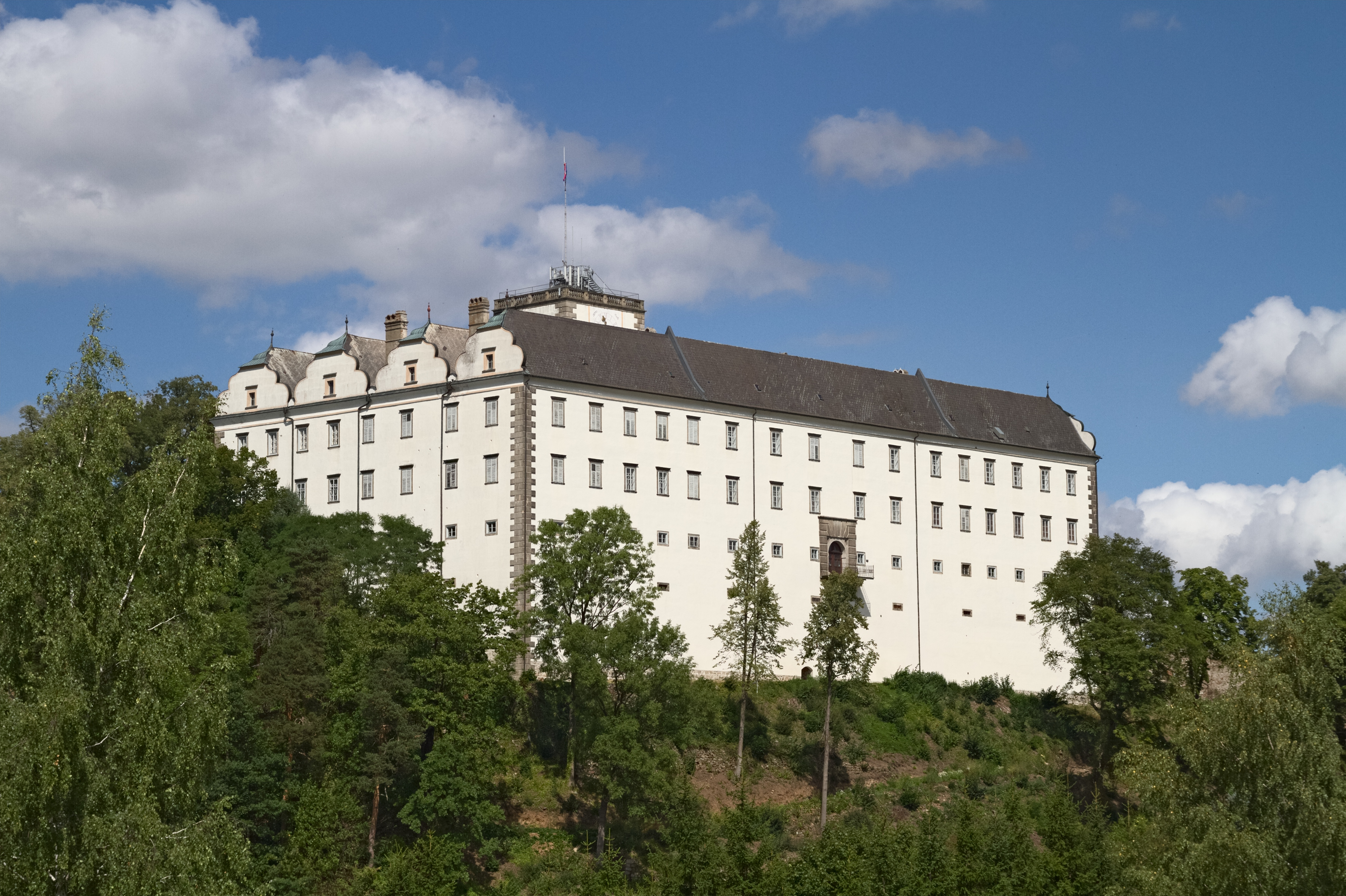
Weitra Castle, Lower Austria

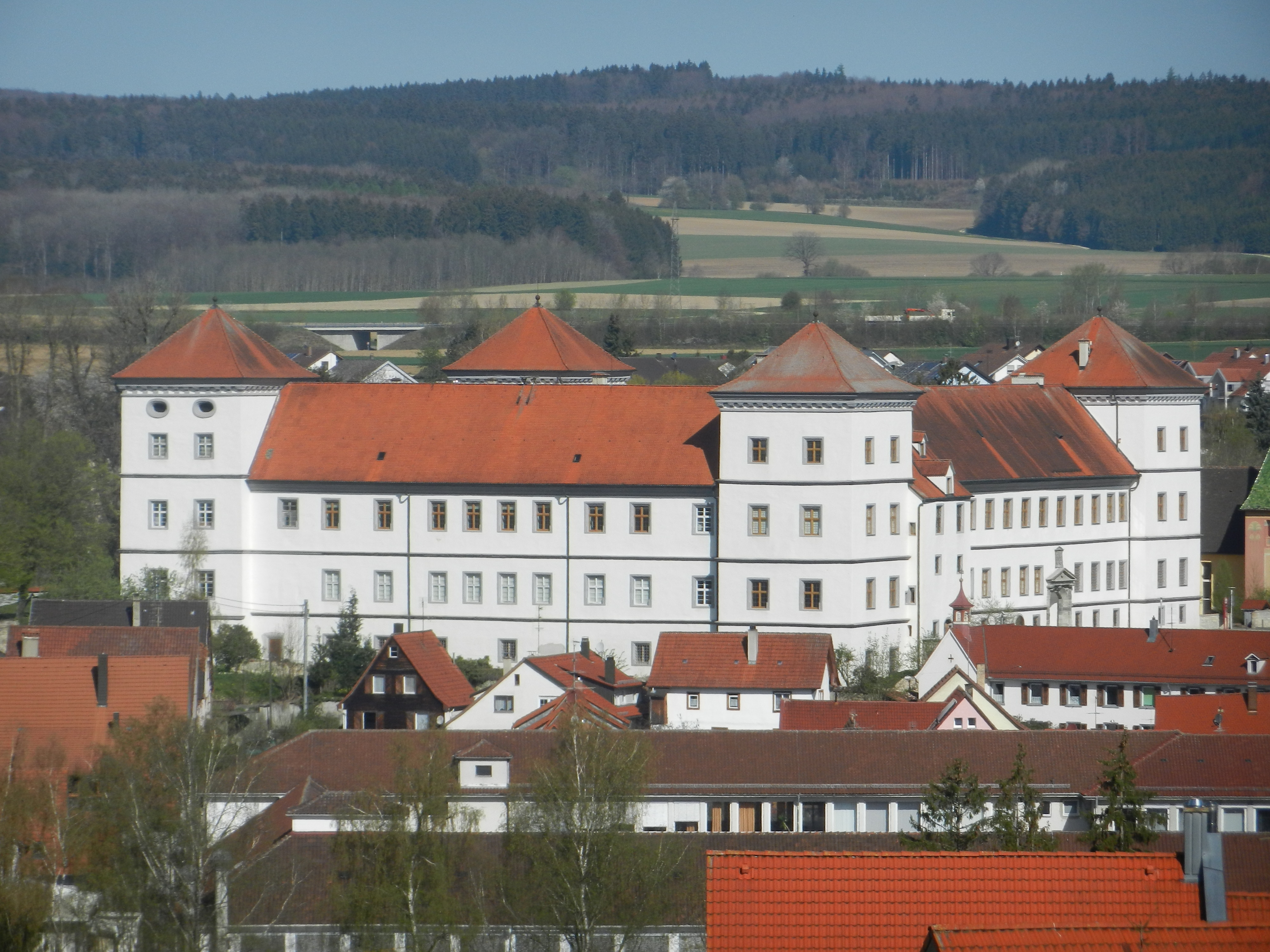
Meßkirch Castle, Germany

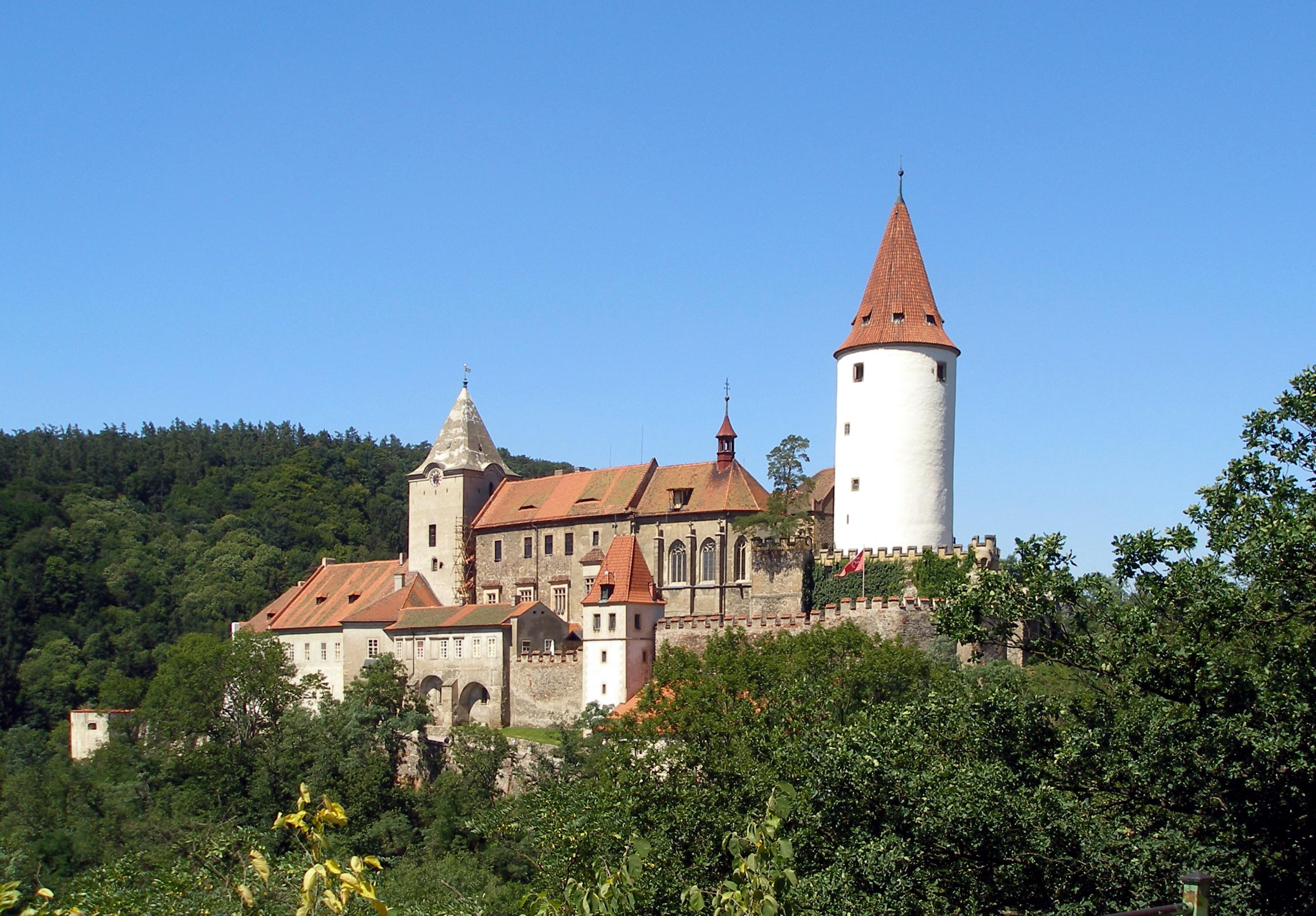
Křivoklát Castle, Bohemia

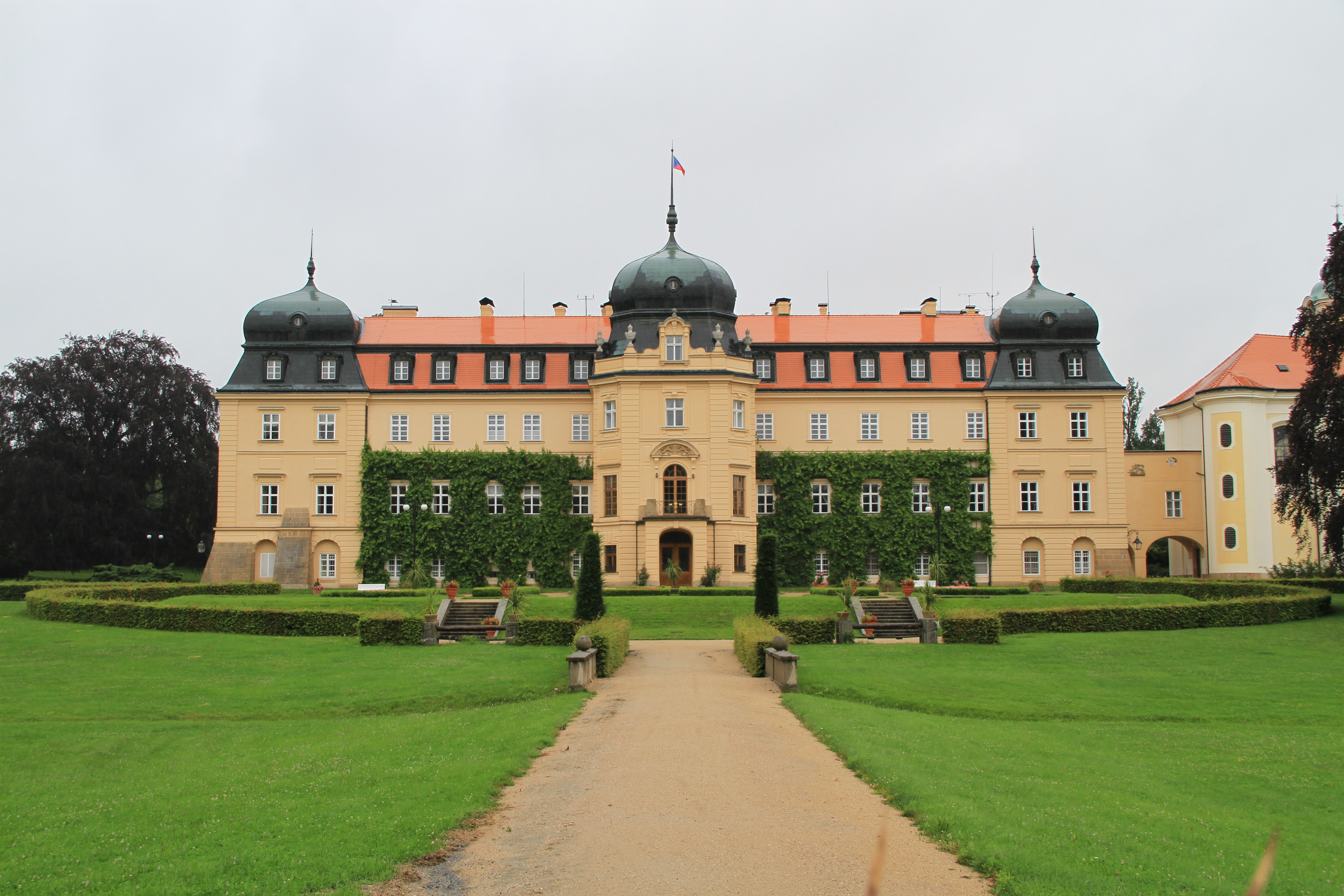
Lány Castle, Bohemia

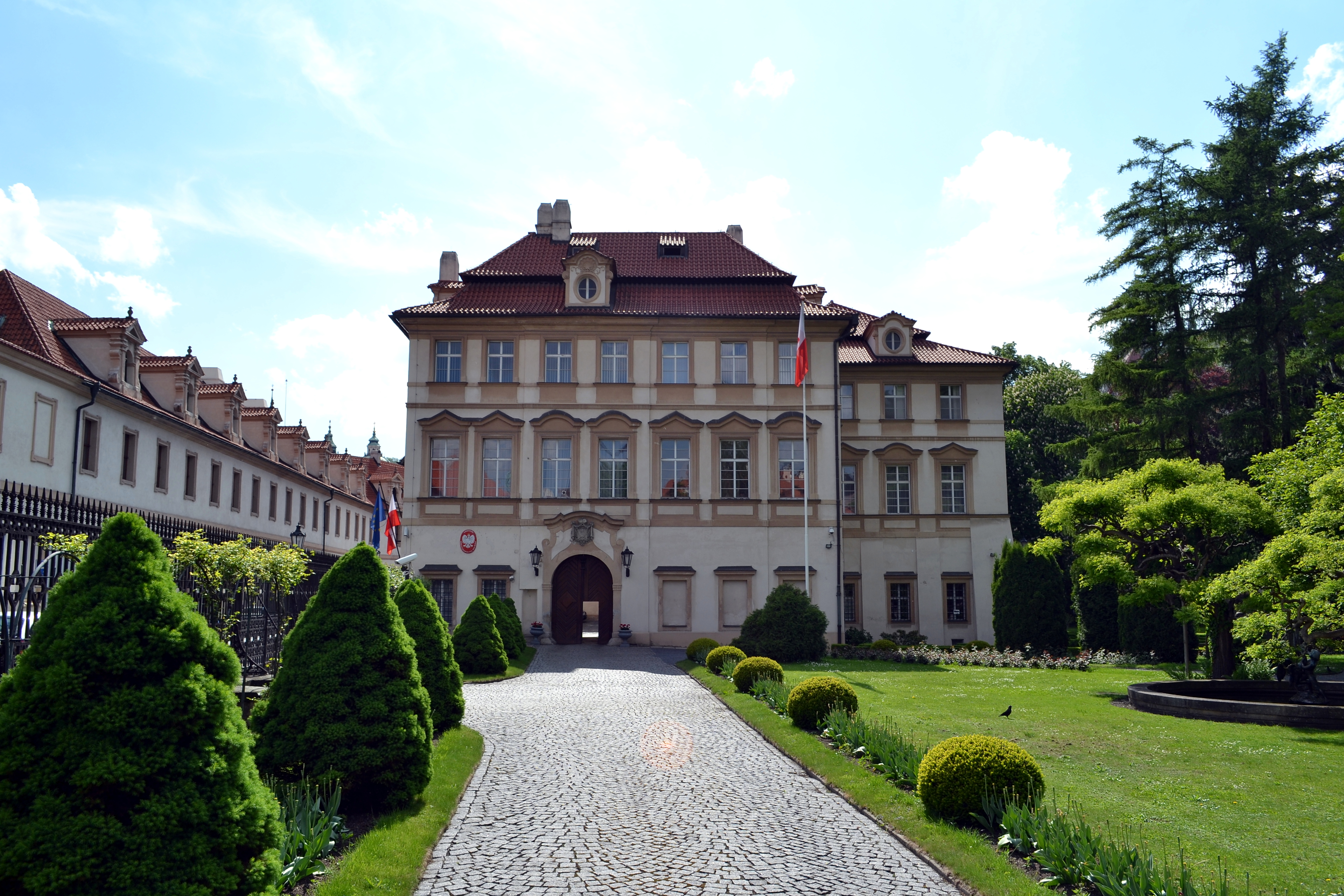
Fürstenberg Palace, Prague

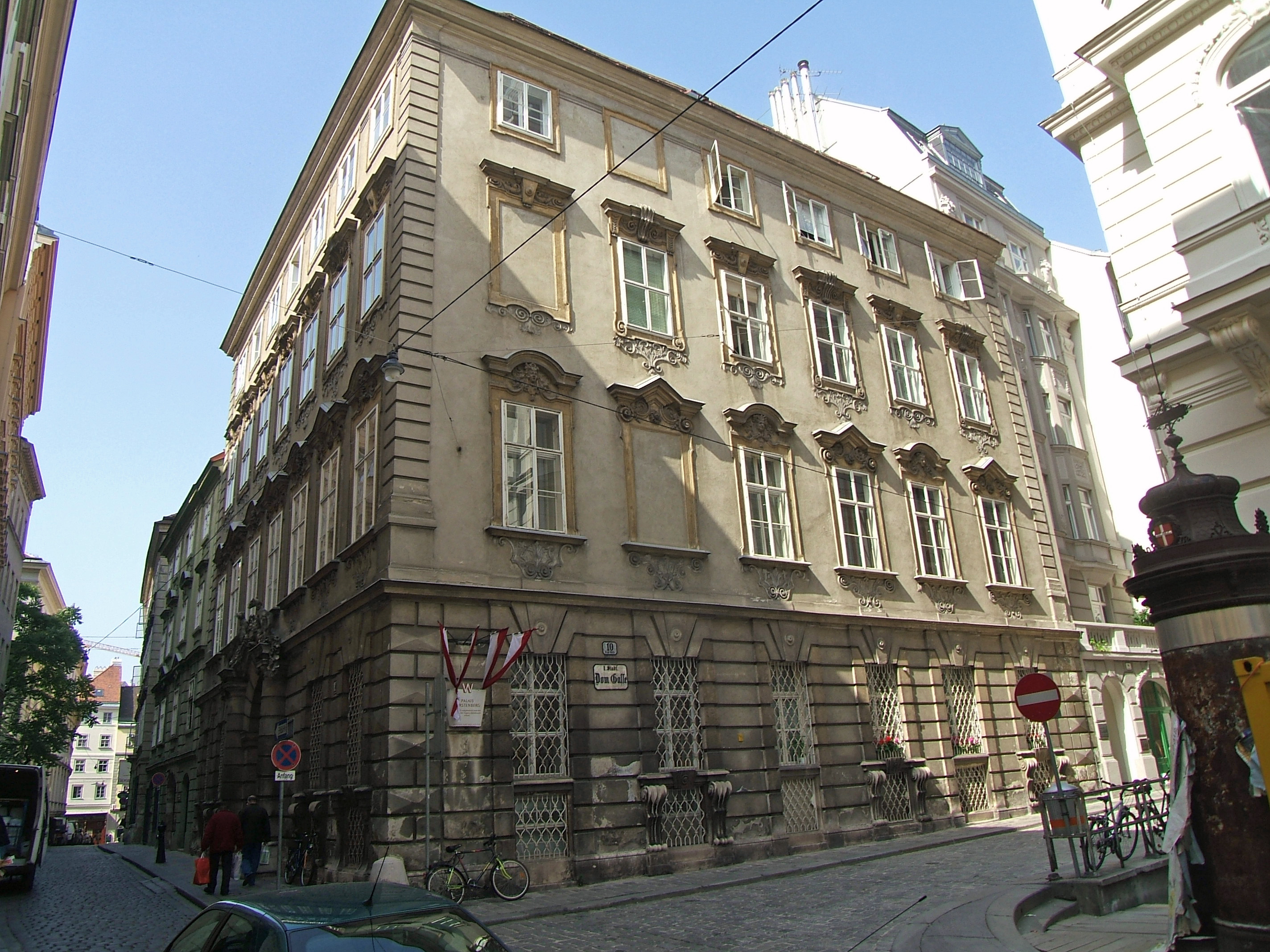
Fürstenberg Palace, Vienna

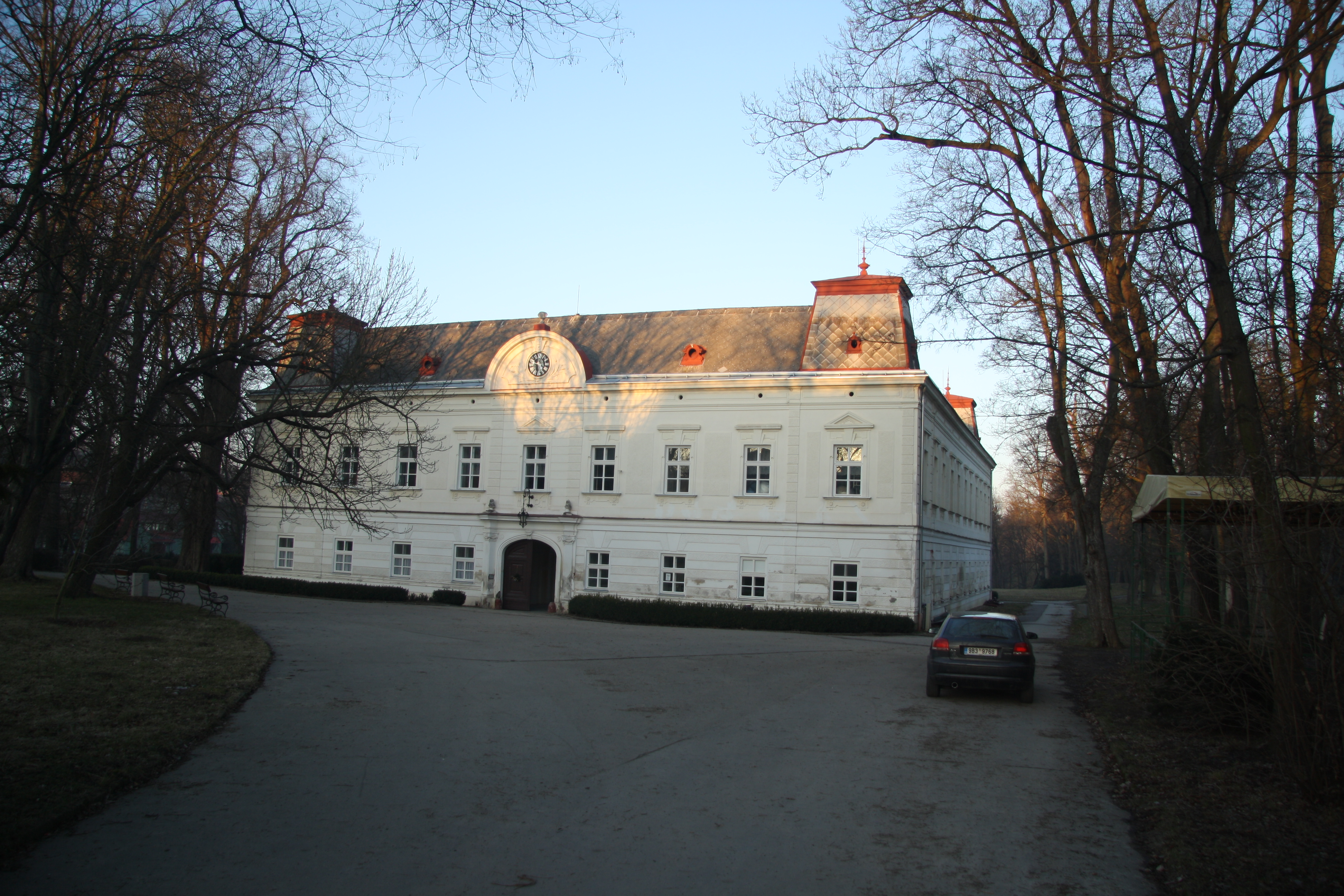
Tavíkovice Castle, Bohemia

== Princes of the Stühlingen branch ==
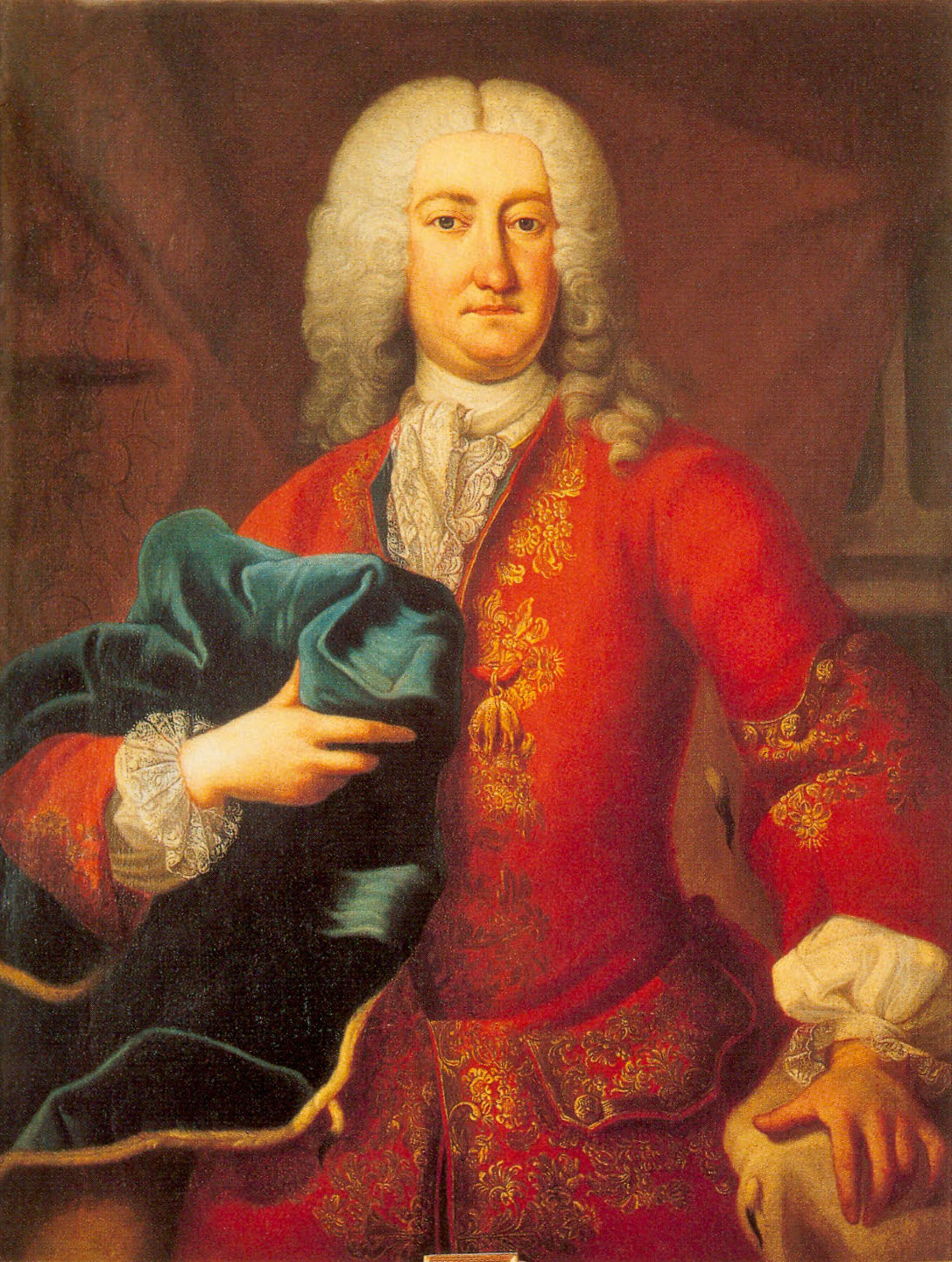
Joseph Wilhelm Ernst, Prince of Fürstenberg (1699–1762)

=== First prince ===
The first Fürst zu Fürstenberg of the Fürstenberg-Stühlingen branch, which mainly resided in Bohemia, Joseph Wilhelm Ernst, was born 12 January 1699. He was the second son of Prosper Ferdinand, Count of Fürstenberg-Stühlingen, killed at the Landau on 21 November 1704 during the War of the Spanish Succession, and his wife Sophia, Countess of Königsegg-Rothenfels (1674–1727). On 2 February 1716, Joseph Wilhelm Ernst was raised to princely status, after the princely Heiligenberg branch had become extinct. He married in 1723 countess Maria Anna of Waldstein-Wartenberg (22 February 1707–12 November 1756). After her death in 1756, he married in 1761 to Maria Anna countess von der Wahl (born 22 September 1736 – 21 March 1808). He died in Vienna, 29 April 1762.

There was no issue from his second marriage. From his first marriage, he had eight children:

1. Marie Eleonore, 15 December 1726 – 16 December 1726
2. Joseph Wenzel Johann Nepomuk, Prague 21 March 1728 – Donaueschingen 2 June 1783
3. Karl Borromäus Egon, Prague, 7 May 1729 – Prague 11 July 1787. He married on 25 June 1753 to the Countess (Gräfin) Maria Josepha von Sternberg (24 June 1735 – 16 January 1803).
4. Maria Augusta Josepha, an abbess in Hradčany, 1731 – 1770
5. Marie Henriette Josepha, born in Prague 31 March 1732 and died in Regensburg 4 June 1772. Married in Regensburg to Prince Alexander Ferdinand von Thurn und Taxis
6. Maria Emanuela Sophie (nun), Prague, 25 December 1733 – 28 March 1776
7. Maria Theresia Josepha (nun), Prague, 4 September 1736 – 8 May 1774

=== Second prince ===
Joseph Wenzel Johann Nepomuk was the first son of the first prince. He was born in Prague, Prague 2 March 1728, and died at Donaueschingen 2 June 1783; he married 21 July 1748 to the Countess (Gräfin) Maria Josepha von Waldburg und Trauchburg (30 March 1731 – 7 May 1782).

They had seven children:

1. Johann Nepomuck Joseph, 7 July 1755 – 6 October 1755
2. Josepha Johanna Benedikta, 14 November 1756 – 2 October 1809; married at Donaueschingen 1779 to landgrave Philipp Nerius Maria zu Fürstenberg, oldest surviving son of her uncle, Karl Borromäus Egon
3. Joseph Maria Benedikt Karl, third Fürst zu Fürstenberg, 9 January 1758, died at Donaueschingen 24 June 1796; married in Hechingen 1778 to Maria Antonia von Hohenzollern-Hechingen (10 November 1760 – 25 July 1797)
4. Maria Anna Josepha, 5 April 1759 – 26 June 1759
5. Karl Alexander, 11 September 1760, 19 February 1761
6. Karl Egon Maria, 5 June 1762, 20 February 1771
7. Karl Joachim Aloys Franz de Paula, fourth Fürst zu Furstenberg, 31 March 1771 – 17 May 1804.

=== Third prince ===
The death in infancy of the eldest son of the second prince placed Joseph Maria Benedikt Karl in the line of direct inheritance as the second son of Joseph Wenzel Johann Nepomuk. He married in Hechingen 1778 to the Princess Maria Antonia von Hohenzollern-Hechingen (10 November 1760 – 25 July 1797). He died at Donaueschingen on 24 June 1796 without issue. The title passed to the next eldest sons of the second prince. Both of those boys, Karl Alexander and Karl Egon Marie had died in infancy and childhood, respectively (1761 and 1771).

=== Fourth prince ===
Karl Joachim Aloys Franz de Paula, became the fourth Fürst zu Fürstenberg, He married in 1796 the Landgravina Karoline Sophie zu Fürstenberg (20 August 1777, – 25 February 1846). Their shared ancestor was Prosper Ferdinand, Count Fürstenberg, who had been killed at Landau in 1704. Karl Joachim Aloys died in 1803 without issue. There were no more surviving males of the first prince's eldest son. The title passed to the line of the second son.

=== Title moves to cadet (junior) branch ===
Karl Borromäus Egon, the second son of the first prince, died in 1788. He had married in 1750 countess Maria Josepha von Sternberg (1735 – 1803). They had three sons:

1. Joseph Maria Wenzel (1754 – 1759) died in childhood.
2. Philipp Nerius Maria 21 October 1755 – 5 June 1790; married in 1779 at Donaueschingen to Josepha Johanna Benedikta von Fürstenberg (14 November 1756 – 2 October 1809). They had one son and two daughters. The son, Karl Gabriel Maria Joseph, born on 2 February 1785, died in Prague on 13 December 1799.
3. Karl Aloys zu Fürstenberg, born 26 June 1760, died 25 March 1799.

Karl Aloys zu Fürstenberg married his cousin Princess Elisabetha Alexandrina von Thurn und Taxis (30 November 1767 – 21 July 1822) in Prague. They had five children:

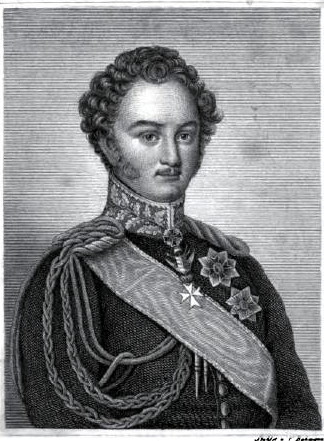
Karl Egon, 5th Prince of Furstenberg (1796–1854)

1. Karl Egon, succeeded his cousin as fifth Fürst zu Fürstenberg 17.5.1804, died on 22 October 1854. Married in Karlsruhe 19 April 1818 Amalie of Baden (1795 – 1869)
2. Marie Leopoldine, born in Prague, 4 September 1791. Married Karl Albrecht of Hohenlohe-Waldenburg-Schillingsfürst. Died in Kupferzell 10 January 1844.
3. Maria Joseph, born and died 9 September 1792
4. Antonie (28 October 1794 – 1 October 1799)
5. Maria Anna (1798–1799)

On 25 March 1799, Karl Aloys was killed at the Battle of Stockach. His nephew died in December 1799. Consequently, when his cousin, Karl Joachim Aloys Franz de Paula, died, his own son, Karl Egon, became the fifth Prince (Fürst).

=== Heads of the House after Mediatization ===
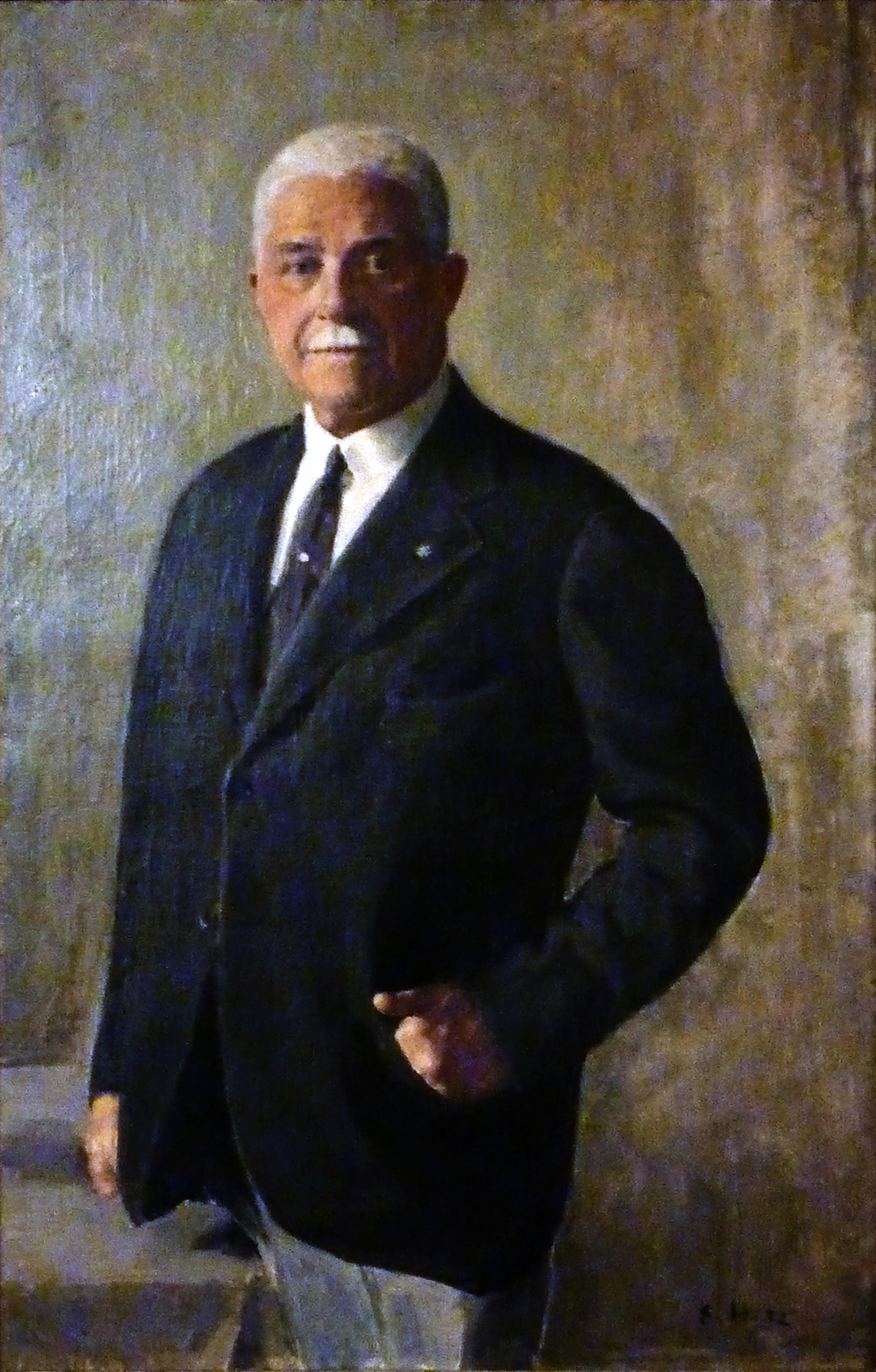
Maximilian Egon II, Prince of Fürstenberg (1863–1941)

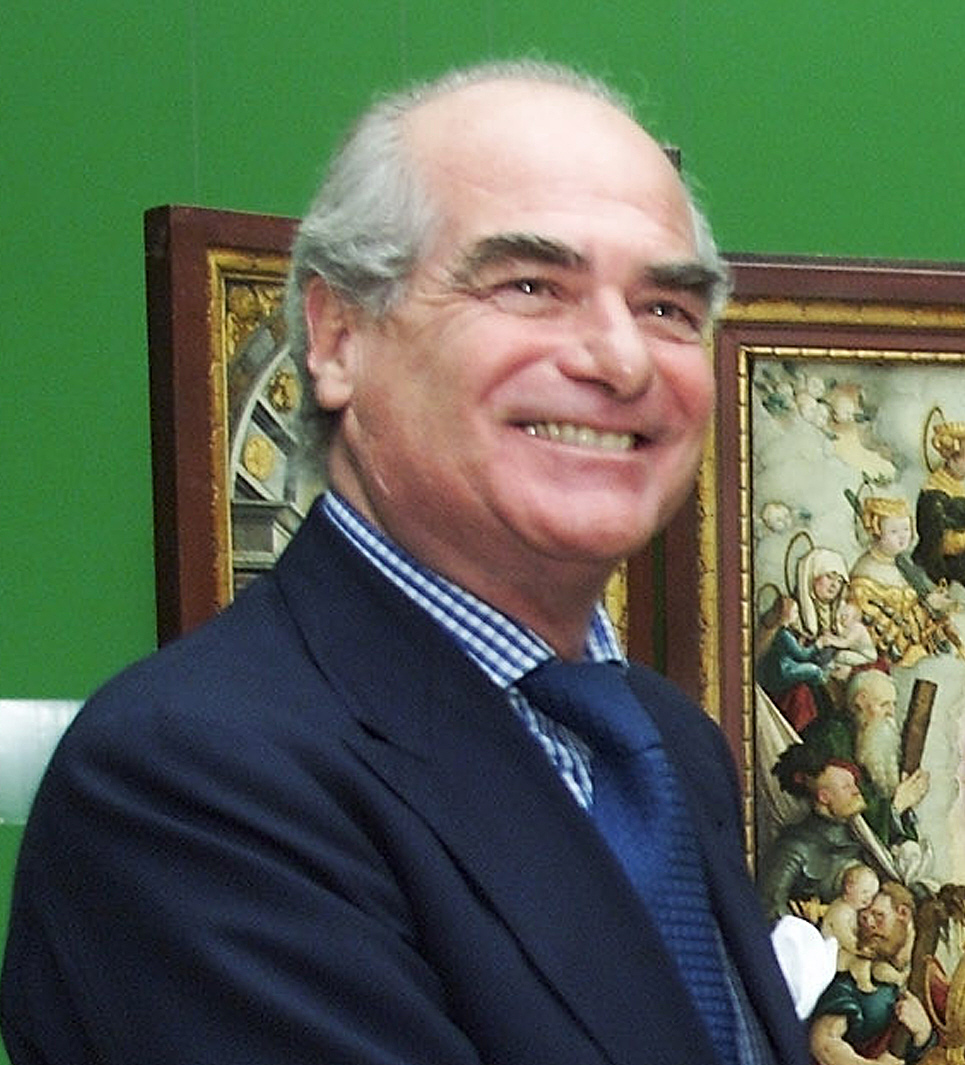
Heinrich Fürst zu Fürstenberg (1950–2024)

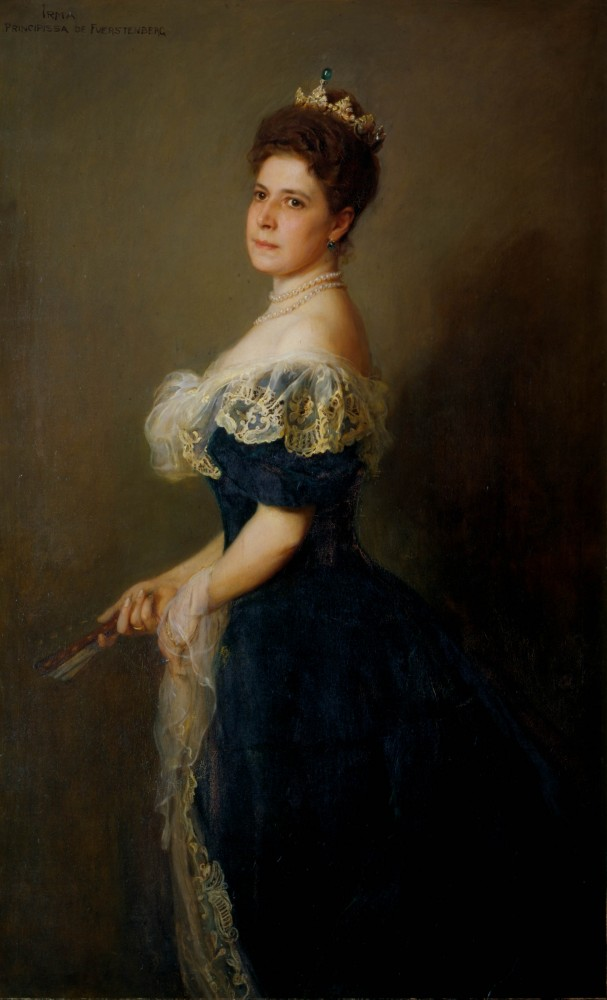
Irma Fürstin zu Fürstenberg, née Countess Schönborn-Buchheim, by Philip de László

- 1804–1854 Karl Egon II (1796–1854) ∞ Princess Amalie of Baden
- 1854–1892 Karl Egon III (1820–1892) ∞ Princess Elisabeth Henrietta of Reuss (Elder Line)
- 1892–1896 Karl Egon IV (1852–1896) ∞ Countess Dorothea of Talleyrand-Périgord
- 1896–1941 Maximilian Egon II (1863–1941) ∞ Countess Irma of Schönborn-Buchheim
- 1941–1973 Karl Egon V (1891–1973) ∞ Countess Ida von Nostitz-Rieneck
- 1973–2002 Joachim Egon (1923–2002) ∞ Countess Paula von Königsegg-Aulendorf; nephew of the former
- 2002–2024 Heinrich (1950–2024) ∞ Princess Massimiliana of Windisch-Graetz;
- since 2024 Christian (born 1977) ∞ Jeannette Griesel; son of the former
  - Elder son and heir apparent: Hereditary Prince Tassilo (born 2013)

== Castellini Baldissera ==
A number of the title bearing members of the House of Fürstenberg are members of the Castellini Baldissera family, an Italian aristocratic family originating from alpine foothills in Lombardy.

== Notable members of the House of Fürstenberg ==
- Frederick IV of Fürstenberg (1563–1617)
- Ernst Egon VIII von Fürstenberg (1588–1635), Bavarian general
- Elisabeth of Fürstenburg (1621–1662), princess
- Franz Egon von Fürstenberg (1625–1682), Bishop of Strasbourg (1663–1682)
- Wilhelm Egon von Fürstenberg (1629–1704), Bishop of Strasbourg (1682–1704)
- Princess Amelie of Fürstenberg (1821–1899), Duchess consort of Ratibor and Princess consort of Corvey

=== Recent notable members ===
- Maximilian Egon II, Prince of Fürstenberg (1863–1941), politician
- Maximilien de Fürstenberg (1904–1988), Belgian cardinal
- Ira von Fürstenberg (1940–2024), socialite and actress
- Prince Egon von Fürstenberg (1946–2004), fashion designer
- Catherine von Fürstenberg-Dussmann (born 1951), actress, designer and businesswoman
- Prince Alexander von Fürstenberg (born 1970), businessman
- Princess Tatiana von Fürstenberg (born 1971), rock singer and film maker
- Princess Virginia von Fürstenberg (1974–2023), fashion designer and artist
- Princess Matilde zu Fürstenberg (née Borromeo; born 1983), equestrian
- Princess Alison von Fürstenberg, fashion designer and model
- Princess Talita von Fürstenberg (born 1999), model and designer

=== Former members by marriage ===
- Clara von Fürstenberg (1920–2016), socialite
- Diane von Fürstenberg (born 1946), fashion designer
- Adelina von Fürstenberg (born 1946), contemporary art curator
- Alexandra von Fürstenberg (born 1972), furniture designer

== See also ==
- Fürstenberg (disambiguation)
- Fürstenberg (state)
- House of Fürstenberg (Westphalia)
