= Maximilian Egon II, Prince of Fürstenberg =

Maximilian Egon II
- Prince of Fürstenberg
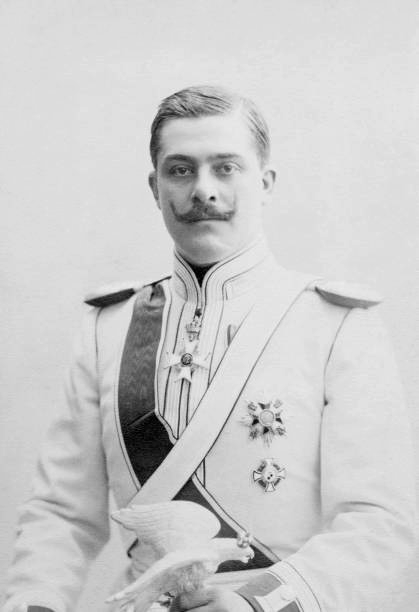
- Photograph of Max Egon II, 1890s

Head of the House of Fürstenberg
- Tenure: 1896–1941
- Predecessor: Charles Egon IV
- Successor: Charles Egon V
- Born: Maximilian Egon Christian Karl Aloys Emil Leo Richard Anton; 13 October 1863; Lány, Bohemia, Austrian Empire
- Died: 11 August 1941 (aged 77); Heiligenberg Castle, Nazi Germany
- Spouse: Countess Irma von Schönborn-Buchheim (m. 1889; died 1941)
- Issue: Charles Egon V, Prince of Fürstenberg; Princess Leotina; Princess Anna; Prince Maximilian Egon; Prince Friedrich Eduard; Marie-Louise-Auguste von Almey
- House: Fürstenberg
- Father: Prince Maximilian Egon I of Fürstenberg
- Mother: Countess Leontina von Khevenhüller-Metsch

Maximilian Egon II, Prince of Fürstenberg (13 October 1863 – 11 August 1941) was a German landowner, investor and nobleman who was the head of the House of Fürstenberg from 1896 to 1941.

== Early life ==
Born as Prince Maximilian Egon Christian Karl Aloys Emil Leo Richard Anton zu Fürstenberg, he was the son of Prince Maximilian Egon I of Fürstenberg and his wife, Countess Leontina von Khevenhüller-Metsch, a daughter of Richard, 5th Prince of Khevenhüller-Metsch. He had a younger brother, born in 1867, named Prince Karl Emil Egon zu Fürstenberg.

== Career ==
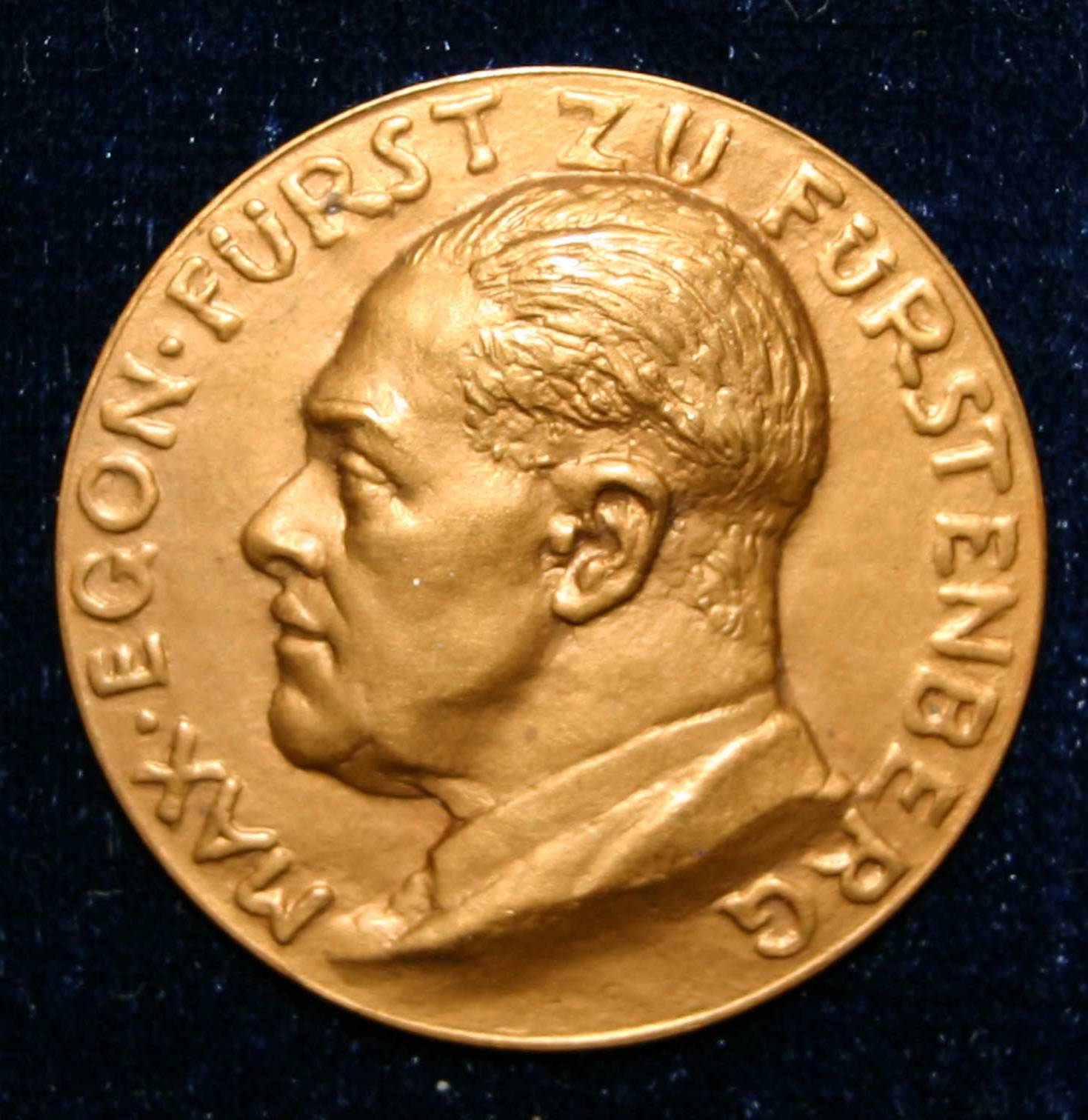
Max Egon II. zu Fürstenberg medal, 1933

A close friend and adviser of Emperor Wilhelm II of Germany, Max of Fürstenberg inherited territorial titles in Prussia, Austria, Hungary, Württemberg and Baden, and by virtue of them had a seat in the House of Lords in each of the five states. Until the First World War, he was vice-president of the Prussian House of Lords.

His principal residence was the Princely Palace in Donaueschingen, near the source of the Danube, where he owned large deer forests. Emperor Wilhelm II frequently visited him there, and Max invariably accompanied the Emperor on his hunting expeditions and Norwegian trips. As well as his vast ancestral forests, he also owned coal mines, hotels and breweries.

Although he was a member of the high Roman Catholic Uradel who had long stood aloof from party politics, after meeting Adolf Hitler and Ernst Roehm in November 1933, Max became enthusiastic about Hitler's leadership, commenting that "It was wonderful, to be able to meet such a great man".

The same year, 1933, he joined the Nazi Party and the Sturmabteilung (SA). In 1938, he was appointed to the rank of SA-Standartenführer.

== Personal life ==
In 1889, he married Countess Irma von Schönborn-Buchheim (1867–1946), a daughter of Erwein, 4th Count of Schönborn-Buchheim, and Countess Franziska von Trauttmansdorff-Weinsberg. Together, they were the parents of three sons and two daughters:

- Prince Charles Egon of Fürstenberg (1891–1973), who married Countess Franziska Ida "Mena" von Nostitz-Rieneck.
- Princess Leontina of Fürstenberg (1892–1979), who married Hugo, 4th Prince of Windisch-Graetz in 1912.
- Princess Anna of Fürstenberg (1894–1928), who married Franz, 8th Prince of Khevenhüller-Metsch in 1913.
- Prince Maximilian Egon of Fürstenberg (1896–1959), who married Countess Wilhelmine von Schönburg-Glauchau in 1921.
- Prince Friedrich Eduard of Fürstenberg (1898–1916), who was killed in action during World War I.

He also had an illegitimate daughter, Marie-Louise-Auguste von Almey, by a liaison with Baroness Marguerite von Almey.

He died in 1941, during the Second World War, and was succeeded by his son, Karl Egon V (1891–1973).

=== Descendants ===
Through his daughter Anna, he was a grandfather of Maximilian, 9th Prince of Khevenhüller-Metsch, who married Countess Wilhelmine Henckel von Donnersmarck.

== Gallery ==
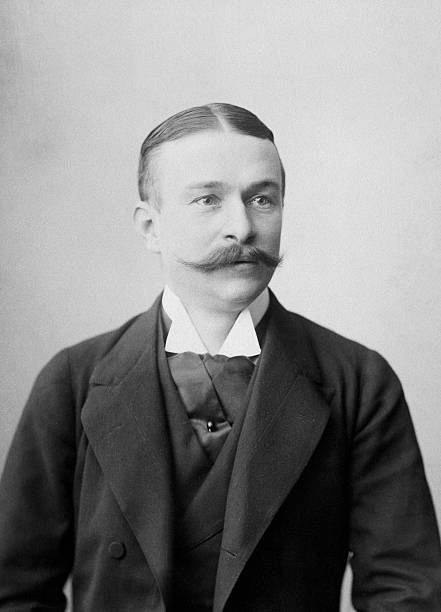
Photograph, 1897.

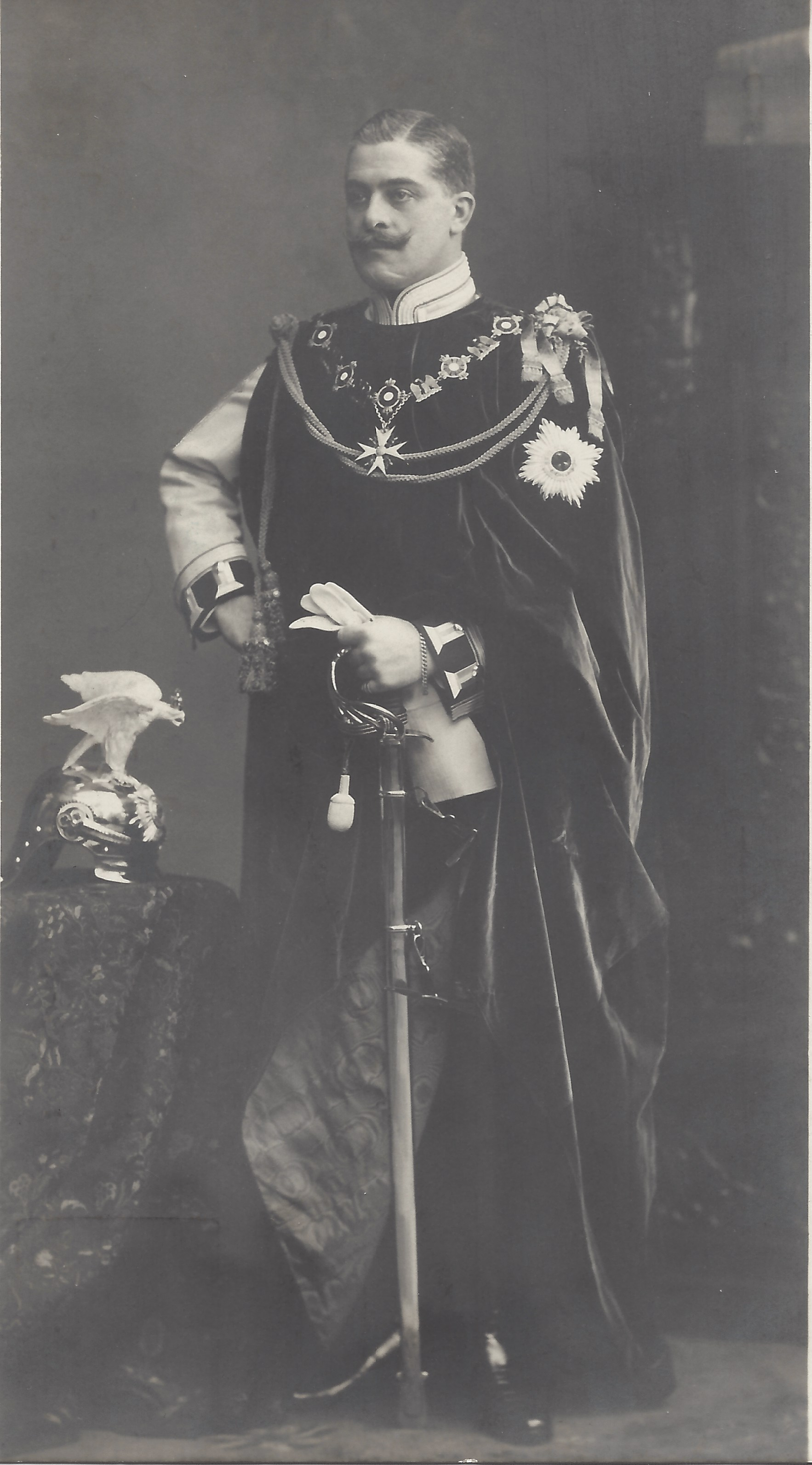
Photograph, c. 1905.

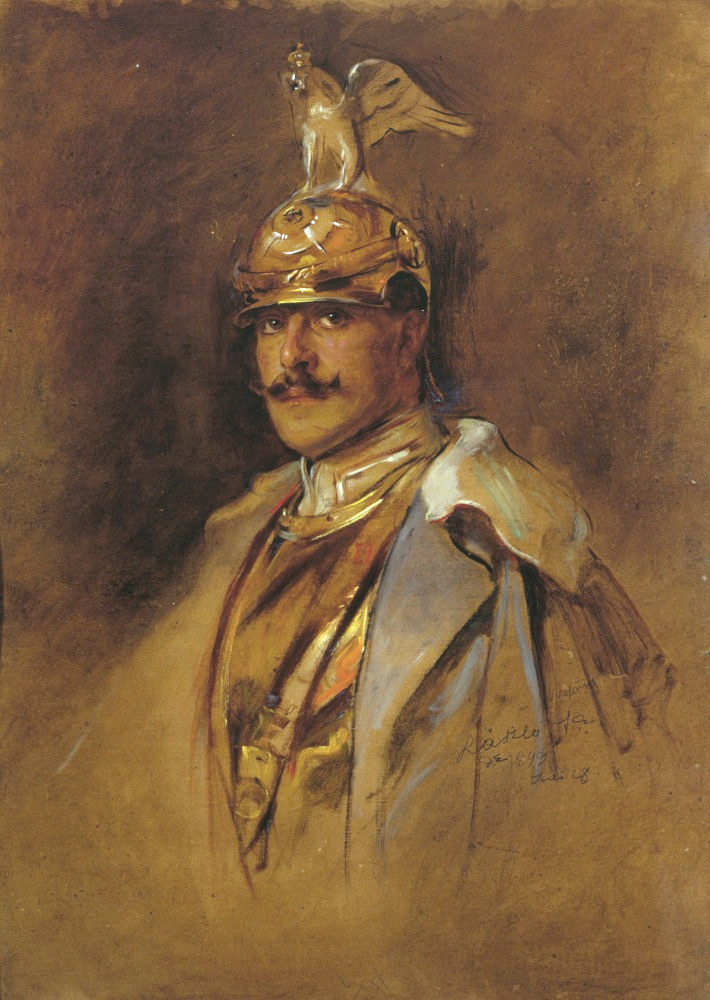
Portrait, by Philip de László, 1899.

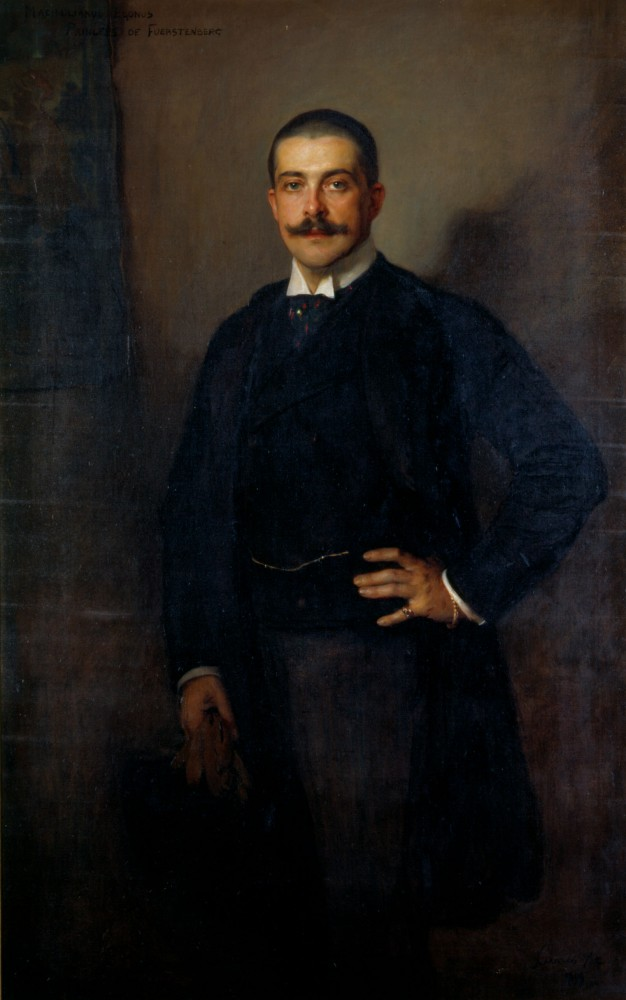
Portrait, by Philip de László, 1899.

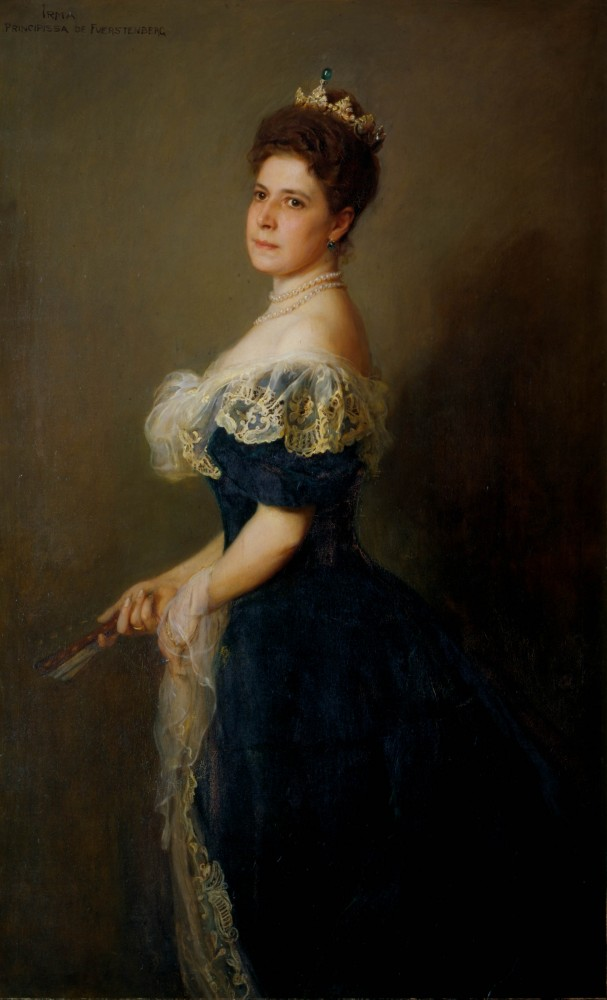
Portrait of his wife Irma, by Philip de László, 1899.

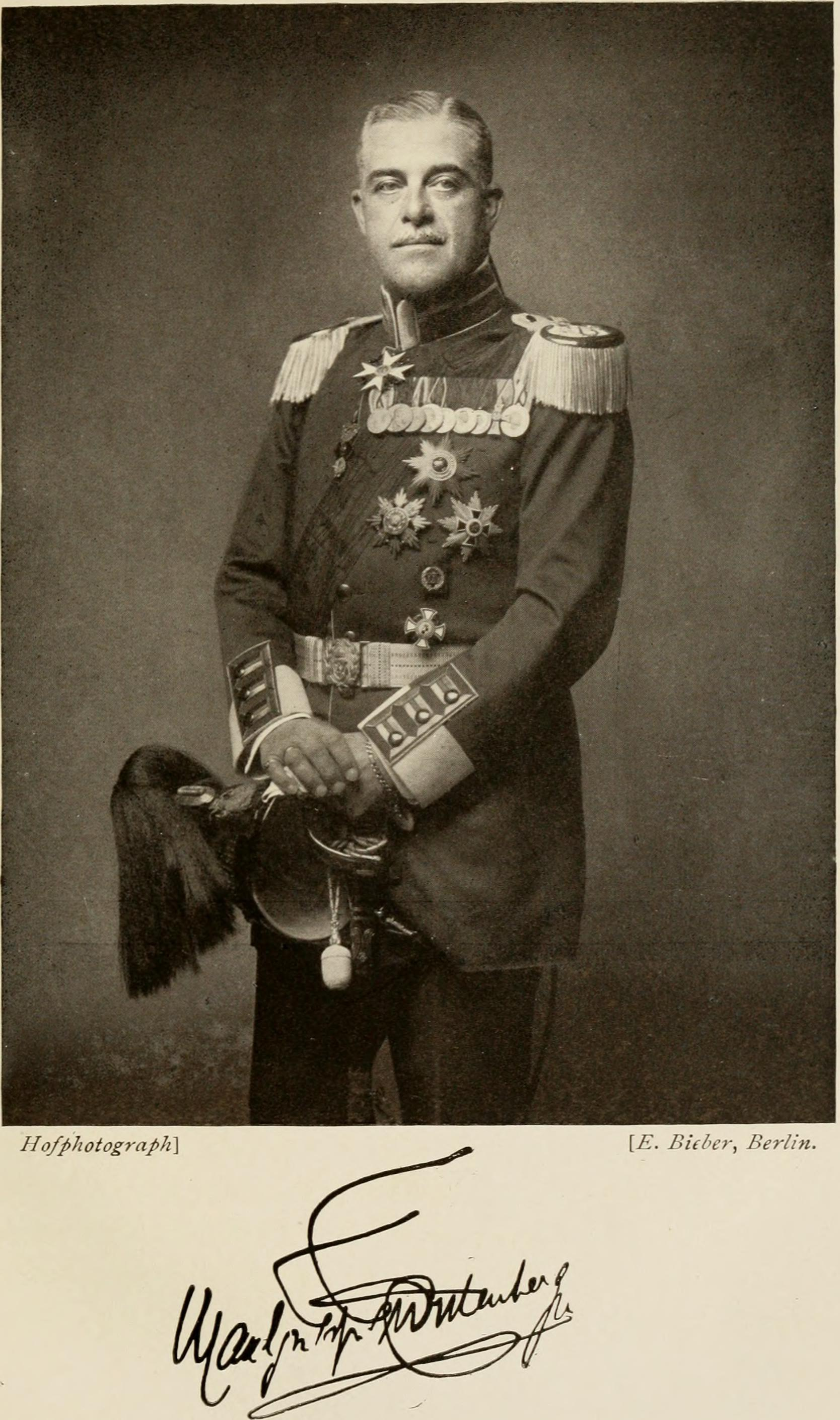
Photograph and signature, 1913.

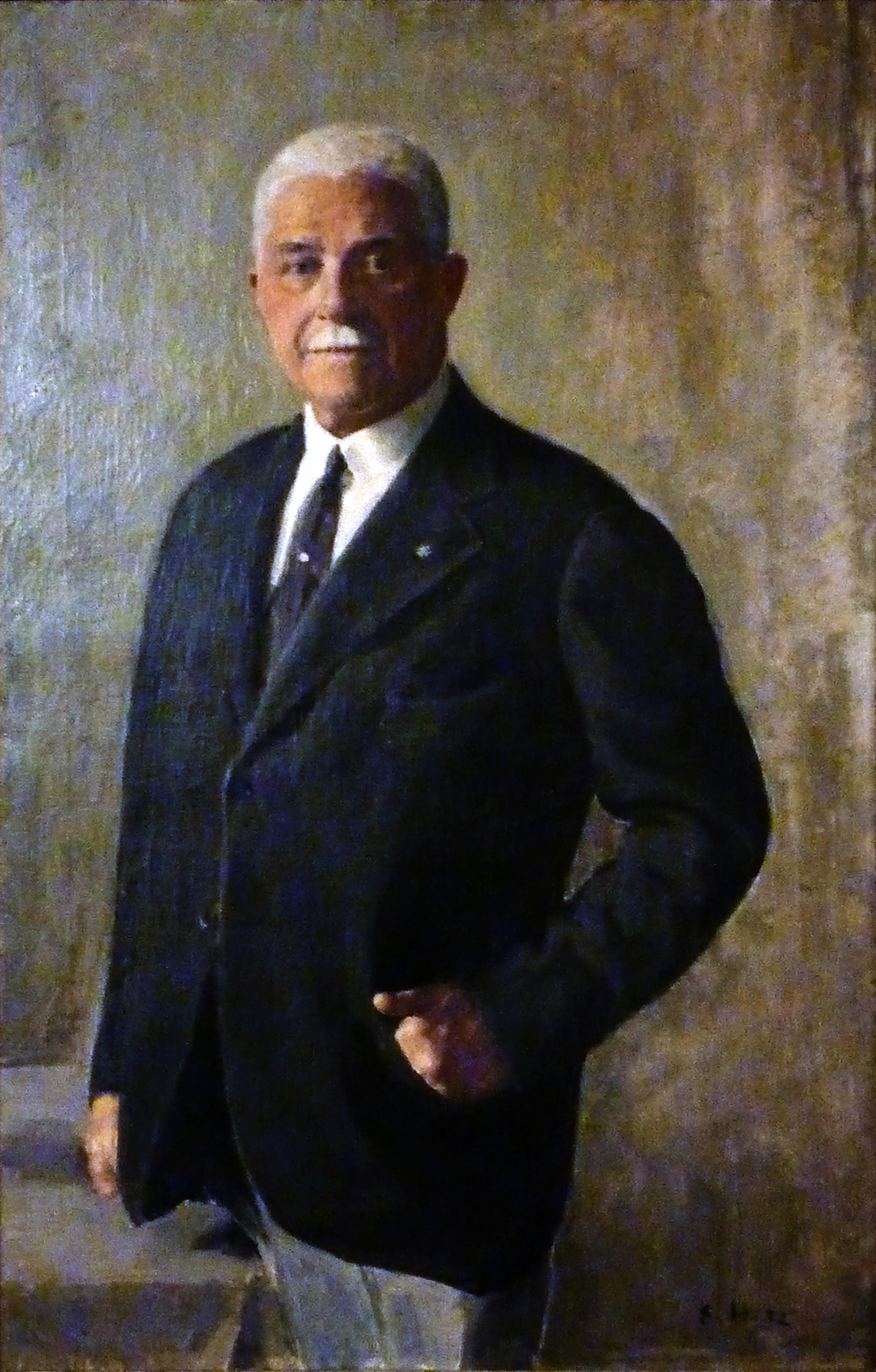
Portrait from the Market Hall of Freiburg.

== Honours and awards ==
- Kingdom of Prussia:
  - Knight of the Red Eagle, 1st Class, 27 January 1899
  - Grand Commander's Cross of the Royal House Order of Hohenzollern
  - Knight of the Black Eagle, with Collar
- Hohenzollern: Cross of Honour of the Princely House Order of Hohenzollern, 1st Class
- Baden:
  - Knight of the House Order of Fidelity, 1896
  - Grand Cross of the Order of Berthold the First, 1896
- Grand Duchy of Hesse: Grand Cross of the Ludwig Order, 29 August 1908
- Württemberg: Grand Cross of the Württemberg Crown, 1896
- Austria-Hungary:
  - Knight of the Golden Fleece, 1900
  - Grand Cross of the Imperial Order of Leopold, 1908
- Holy See: Grand Cross of the Holy Sepulchre of Jerusalem
- Sovereign Military Order of Malta: Knight of Honour and Devotion
- Sweden: Knight of the Seraphim, 29 August 1911

== Ancestry ==
Ancestors of Maximilian Egon II, Prince of Fürstenberg

8. Charles Aloys, Prince of Fürstenberg
4. Charles Egon II, Prince of Fürstenberg
9. Princess Elisabeth von Thurn und Taxis
2. Maximilian Egon I, Prince of Fürstenberg
10. Charles Frederick, Grand Duke of Baden
5. Princess Amalie of Baden
11. Baroness Caroline Louise Geyer von Geyersberg
1. Maximilian Egon II, Prince of Fürstenberg
12. Prince Johann Franz Joseph von Khevenhüller
6. Prince Richard von Khevenhüller-Metsch
13. Countess Christina Zichy de Zich et Vásonkeö
3. Countess Leontina von Khevenhüller-Metsch
14. Prince Eduard Johann Maria von Lichnowsky-Werdenberg
7. Princess Antonia von Lichnowsky-Werdenberg
15. Countess Eleonora Zichy de Zich et Vásonkeö
