= Louis XIV =

King of France from 1643 to 1715

- Portrait of Louis XIV, 1701

King of France
- Reign: 14 May 1643 – 1 September 1715
- Coronation: 7 June 1654; Reims Cathedral
- Predecessor: Louis XIII
- Successor: Louis XV
- Regent: Anne of Austria (1643–1651)
- Chief ministers: Cardinal Mazarin (1643–1661); Jean-Baptiste Colbert (1661–1683); The Marquis de Louvois (1683–1691)
- Born: 5 September 1638; Château de Saint-Germain-en-Laye, Saint-Germain-en-Laye, France
- Died: 1 September 1715 (aged 76); Palace of Versailles, Versailles, France
- Burial: 9 September 1715; Basilica of Saint-Denis
- Spouses: Maria Theresa of Spain (m. 1660; died 1683) Françoise d'Aubigné, Marquise de Maintenon (private) (m. 1683)
- Issue more...: Louis, Grand Dauphin; Marie Thérèse, Madame Royale; Philippe Charles, Duke of Anjou; Louis François, Duke of Anjou; Illegitimate: Marie Anne, Princess of Conti; Louis, Count of Vermandois; Louis Auguste, Duke of Maine; Louis César, Count of Vexin; Louise Françoise, Princess of Condé; Louise Marie Anne, Mademoiselle de Tours; Françoise Marie, Duchess of Orléans; Louis Alexandre, Count of Toulouse; Louise, Baroness of La Queue
Names
- Louis-Dieudonné de France
- House: Bourbon
- Father: Louis XIII
- Mother: Anne of Austria
- Religion: Catholicism

Louis XIV (Louis-Dieudonné; (Note: lit. 'Louis the God-given') 5 September 1638 – 1 September 1715), known as the "Sun King", (Note: French: Le Roi Soleil) was King of France from 14 May 1643 until his death in 1715. He is the longest-reigning monarch in history, (Note: Some monarchs of states that were not sovereign for most or all of their reign are alleged to have ruled for longer, such as Sobhuza II of Swaziland for 82 years, and Bernard VII of Lippe for 81 years.) reigning for 72 years and 110 days. His reign brought about a golden age in French history, marked by a great expansion of the French colonial empire and a flourishing of French culture throughout Europe. As an absolute monarch, Louis expanded monarchical rule and diminished the power of the nobility, developing a strong centralised state ruled from the Palace of Versailles that persisted until the French Revolution.

Louis became king upon his father Louis XIII's death in 1643. Since he was too young to rule independently, he required a chief minister to rule in his place. His mother and regent, Anne of Austria, thus picked Cardinal Mazarin, who trained him in diplomacy and statecraft. Upon Mazarin's death in 1661, Louis had grown up and decided not to appoint a new chief minister. A believer in the divine right of kings, he sought to eliminate the remnants of feudalism persisting in parts of France by compelling many members of the nobility to reside at his lavish Palace of Versailles. In doing so, he succeeded in pacifying the aristocracy, many of whom had participated in the Fronde rebellions during his minority. Louis enforced uniformity of religion under the Catholic Church. His revocation of the Edict of Nantes abolished the rights of the Huguenot Protestant minority and subjected them to a wave of dragonnades, effectively forcing Huguenots to emigrate or convert, virtually destroying the French Protestant community.

During Louis' long reign, France emerged as the leading European power and regularly declared war. A conflict with Spain marked his entire childhood, while during his personal rule, Louis fought three major continental conflicts, each against powerful foreign alliances: the Franco-Dutch War, the Nine Years' War, and the War of the Spanish Succession. In addition, France contested shorter wars such as the War of Devolution and the War of the Reunions. Warfare defined Louis's foreign policy, impelled by his personal ambition for glory and power: "a mix of commerce, revenge, and pique". His wars strained France's resources to the utmost, while in peacetime he concentrated on preparing for the next war. He taught his diplomats that their job was to create tactical and strategic advantages for the French military. Upon his death in 1715, Louis XIV left his great-grandson and successor, Louis XV, a powerful but war-weary kingdom, in major debt after the War of the Spanish Succession that had raged on since 1701.

Some of his other notable achievements include the construction of the 240 km (150 mi) Canal du Midi in Southern France, the patronage of artists (the playwrights Molière, Racine, the man of letters Boileau, the composer and dancer Lully, the painter Le Brun and the landscape architect Le Nôtre, all contributed to the apogee of French classicism, described during his lifetime as the "Grand Siècle", or even "the century of Louis XIV"), and the founding of the French Academy of Sciences.

== Early years ==
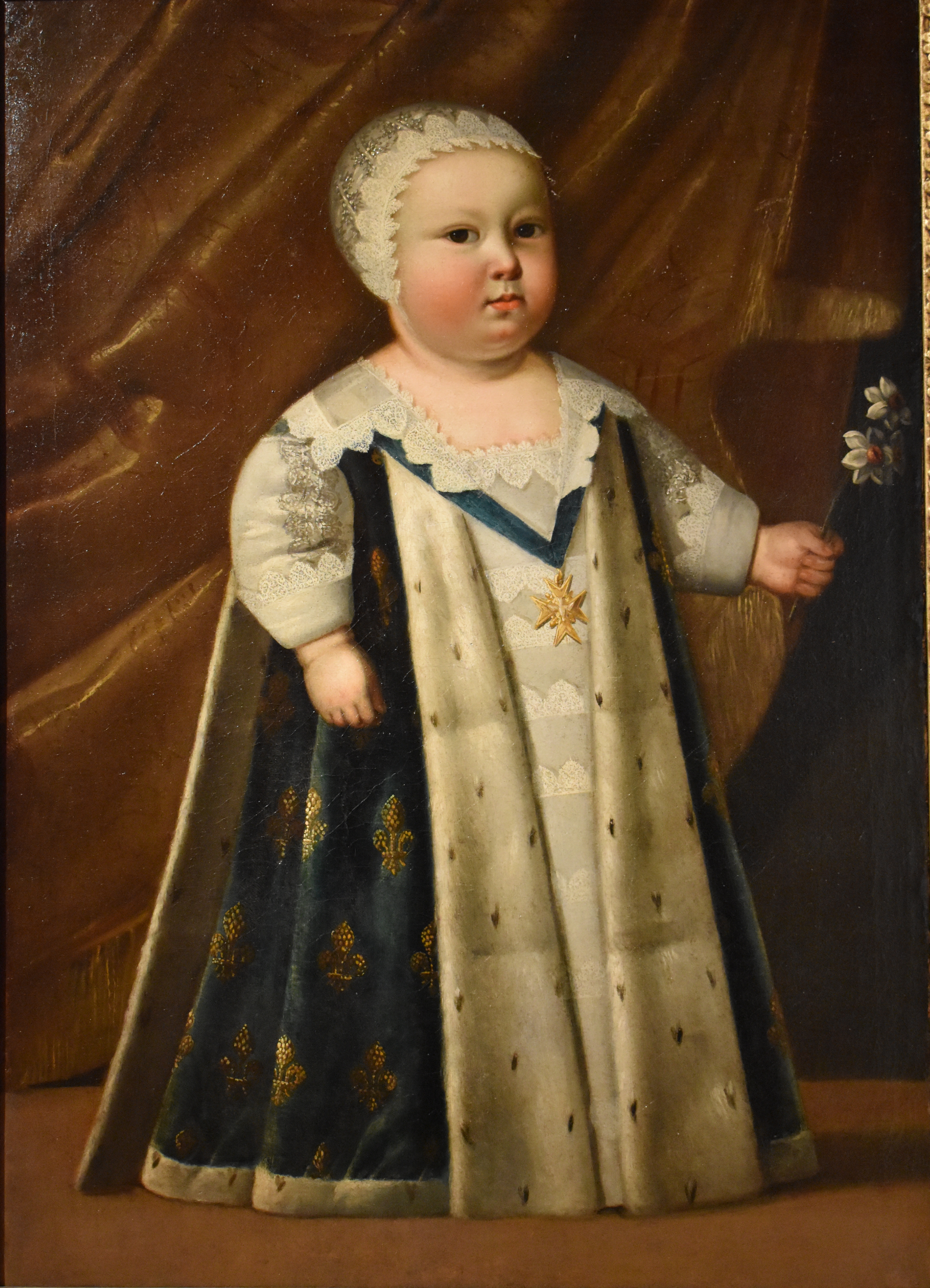
Louis XIV as a young child, by an unknown painter

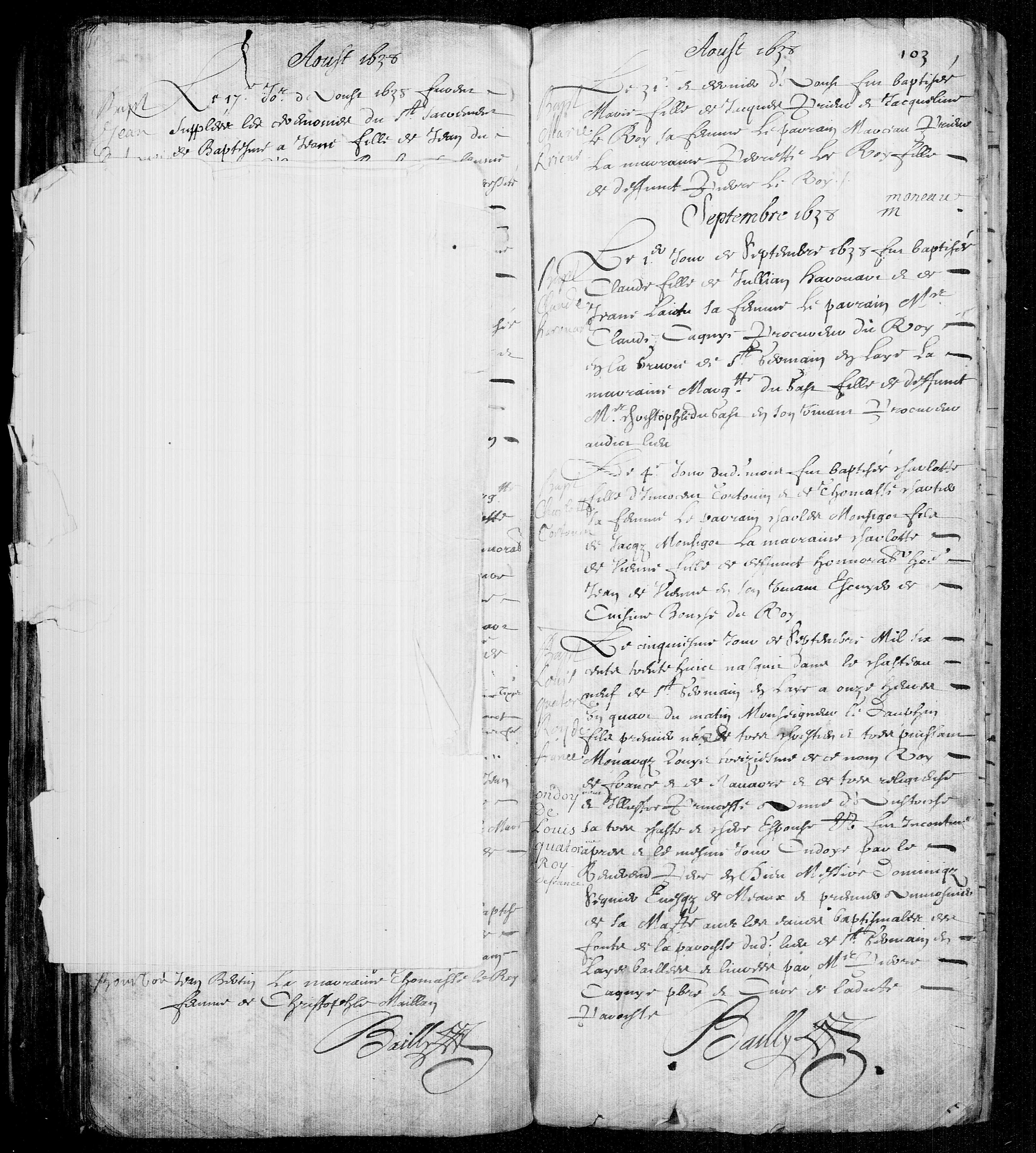
Baptismal certificate, 1638

Louis XIV was born on 5 September 1638 in the Château de Saint-Germain-en-Laye, to Louis XIII and Anne of Austria. He was named Louis Dieudonné (Louis the God-given) and bore the traditional title of French heirs apparent: Dauphin. At the time of his birth, his parents had been married for 23 years. His mother had experienced four stillbirths between 1619 and 1631. Leading contemporaries thus regarded him as a divine gift and his birth a miracle.

Louis' relationship with his mother was uncommonly affectionate for the time. Contemporaries and eyewitnesses claimed that the Queen would spend all her time with Louis. Both were greatly interested in food and theatre. This long-lasting and loving relationship can be evidenced by excerpts in Louis' journal entries, such as:

Nature was responsible for the first knots which tied me to my mother. But attachments formed later by shared qualities of the spirit are far more difficult to break than those formed merely by blood.

It was his mother who gave Louis his belief in the absolute and divine power of his monarchical rule.

During his childhood, he was taken care of by the governesses Françoise de Lansac and Marie-Catherine de Senecey. In 1646, Nicolas V de Villeroy became the young king's tutor. Louis XIV became friends with Villeroy's young children, particularly François de Villeroy, and divided his time between the Palais-Royal and the nearby Hotel de Villeroy.

== Minority and the Fronde ==
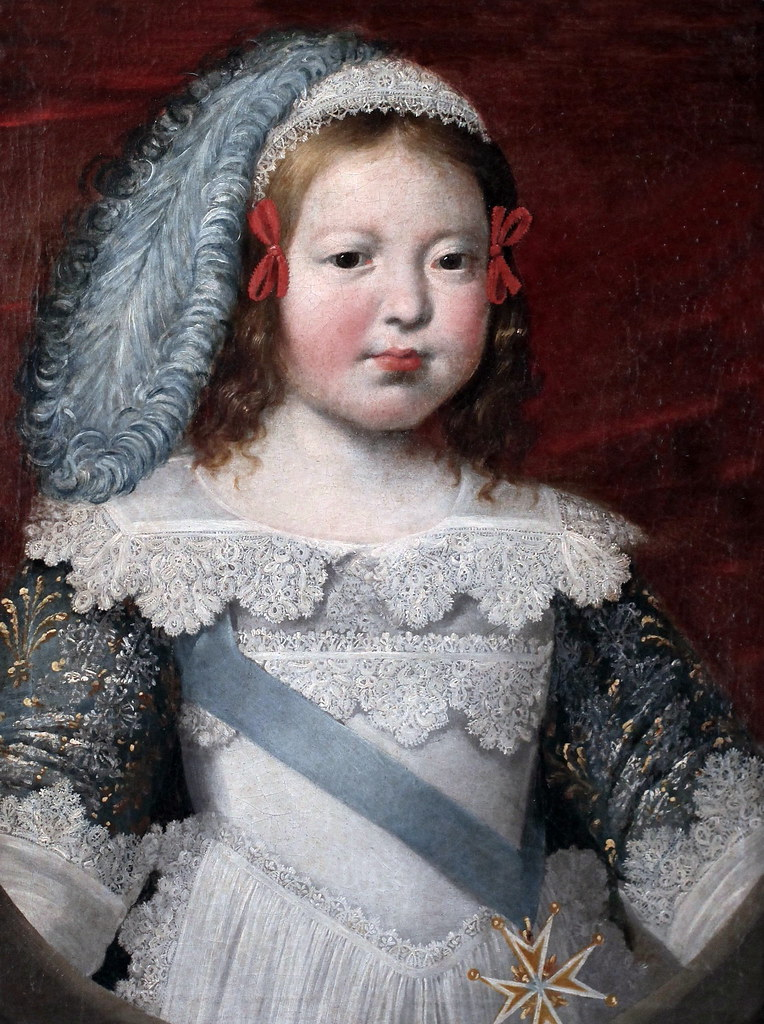
Louis XIV, then Dauphin of France, in 1642, one year before his accession to the throne, by Philippe de Champaigne

=== Accession ===
Sensing imminent death in the spring of 1643, King Louis XIII decided to put his affairs in order for his four-year-old son Louis XIV. Not trusting the judgement of his Spanish wife Queen Anne, who would normally have become the sole regent of France, the king decreed that a regency council would rule on his son's behalf, with Anne at its head.

Louis XIII died on 14 May 1643. On 18 May Queen Anne had her husband's will annulled by the Parlement of Paris, a judicial body of nobles and high-ranking clergy, and she became sole regent. She exiled her husband's ministers Chavigny and Bouthilier and appointed the Count of Brienne as her minister of foreign affairs. Anne kept the direction of religious policy strongly in hand until her son's majority in 1661.

She appointed Cardinal Mazarin as chief minister, giving him the daily administration of policy. She continued the policies of her late husband and Cardinal Richelieu, despite their persecution of her, in order to win absolute authority in France and victory abroad for her son. Anne protected Mazarin by exiling her followers the Duke of Beaufort and Marie de Rohan, who conspired against him in 1643.

The best example of Anne's loyalty to France was her treatment of one of Richelieu's men, the Chancellor Pierre Séguier. Séguier had brusquely interrogated Anne in 1637 (like a "common criminal", as she recalled) following the discovery that she was giving military secrets to her father in Spain, and Anne was virtually under house arrest for years. By keeping the effective Séguier in his post, Anne sacrificed her own feelings for the interests of France and her son Louis.

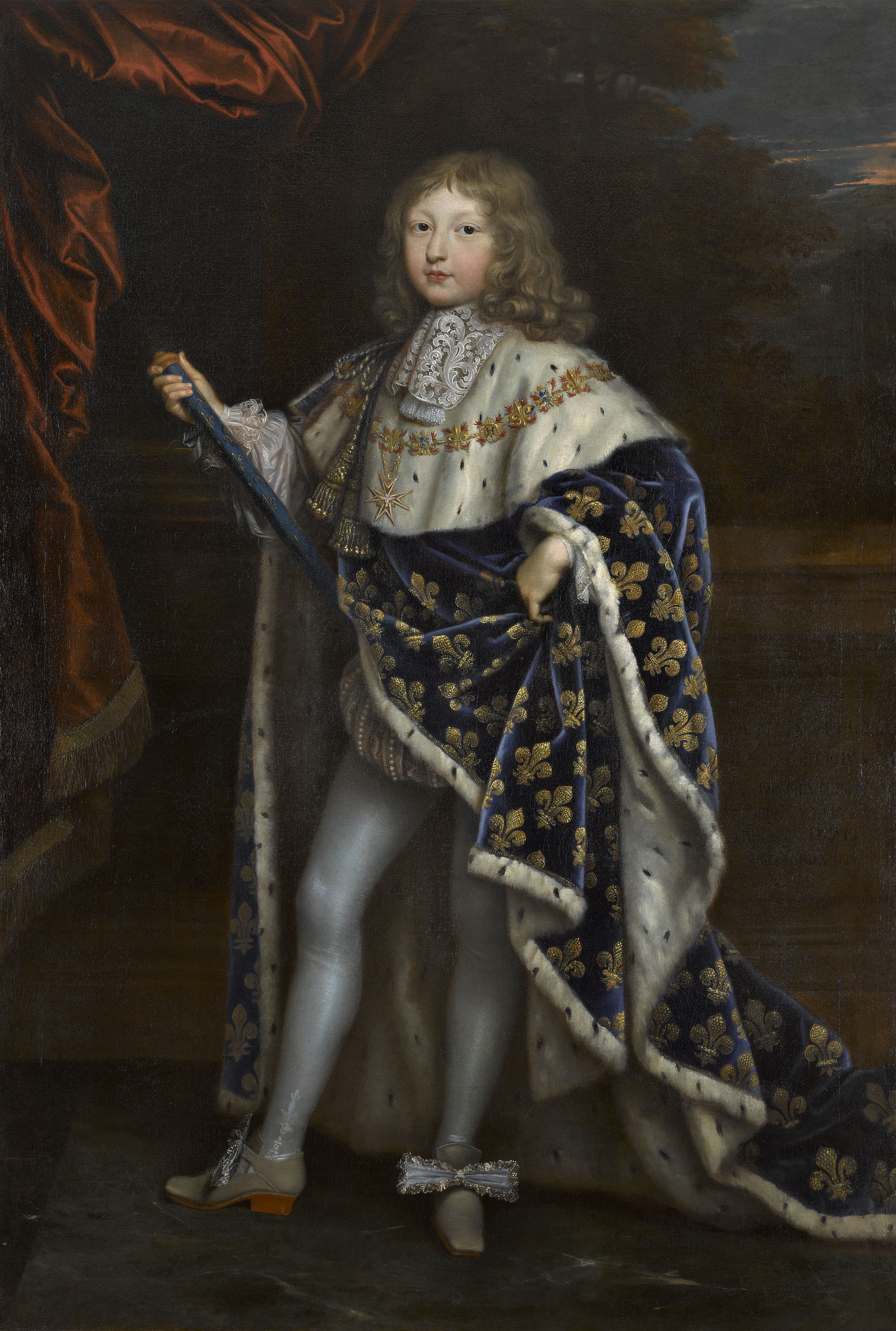
Louis XIV in 1648 by Pierre Mignard I

The Queen sought a lasting peace between Catholic nations, but only after a French victory over her native Spain. She also gave a partial Catholic orientation to French foreign policy. This was felt by the Netherlands, France's Protestant ally, which negotiated a separate peace with Spain in 1648.

In 1648, Anne and Mazarin successfully negotiated the Peace of Westphalia, which ended the Thirty Years' War in which France had actively taken part to further its interests. Its terms formally confirmed the extensive autonomy that the various states of the Holy Roman Empire had enjoyed before the war. It granted Sweden seats on the Imperial Diet and territories controlling the mouths of the Oder, Elbe, and Weser Rivers. France, however, profited most from the settlement. Austria, ruled by the Habsburg Emperor Ferdinand III, ceded all Habsburg lands and claims in Alsace to France and acknowledged her de facto sovereignty over the Three Bishoprics of Metz, Verdun, and Toul. Moreover, many petty German states sought French protection, eager to emancipate themselves from Habsburg domination. This anticipated the formation of the 1658 League of the Rhine, which further diminished Imperial power.

=== Early acts ===
As the Thirty Years' War came to an end, a civil war known as the Fronde erupted in France. It effectively checked France's ability to exploit the Peace of Westphalia. Anne and Mazarin had largely pursued the policies of Cardinal Richelieu, augmenting the Crown's power at the expense of the nobility and the Parlements. Anne was more concerned with internal policy than foreign affairs; she was a very proud queen who insisted on the divine rights of the King of France.

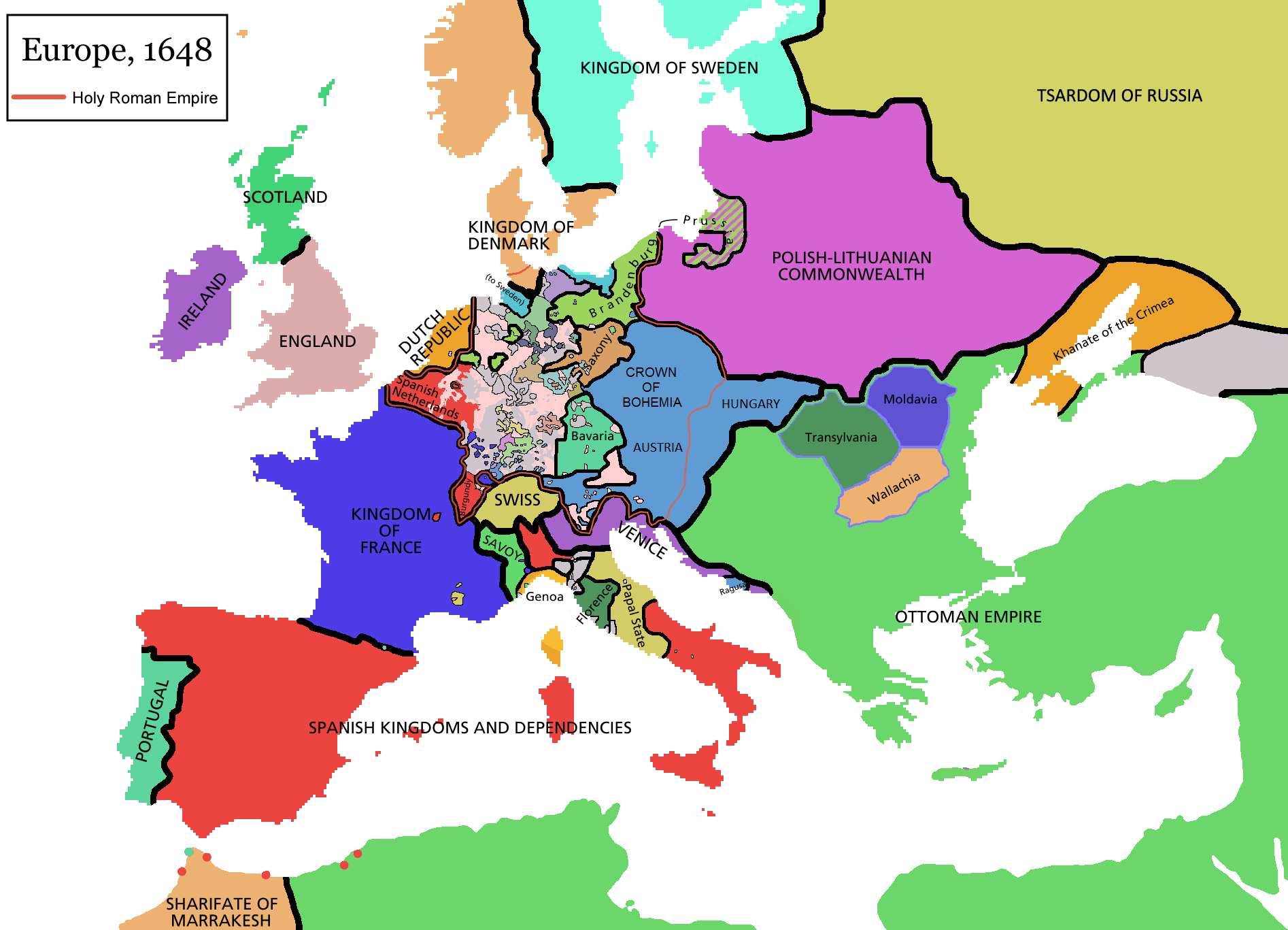
Europe after the Peace of Westphalia in 1648

All this led her to advocate a forceful policy in all matters relating to the King's authority, in a manner that was much more radical than the one proposed by Mazarin. The Cardinal depended totally on Anne's support and had to use all his influence on the Queen to temper some of her radical actions. Anne imprisoned any aristocrat or member of parliament who challenged her will; her main aim was to transfer to her son an absolute authority in the matters of finance and justice. One of the leaders of the Parlement of Paris, whom she had jailed, died in prison.

The Frondeurs, political heirs of the disaffected feudal aristocracy, sought to protect their traditional feudal privileges from the increasingly centralized royal government. Furthermore, they believed their traditional influence and authority was being usurped by the recently ennobled bureaucrats (the Noblesse de Robe, or "nobility of the robe"), who administered the kingdom and on whom the monarchy increasingly began to rely. This belief intensified the nobles' resentment.

In 1648, Anne and Mazarin attempted to tax members of the Parlement de Paris. The members refused to comply and ordered all of the king's earlier financial edicts burned. Buoyed by the victory of Louis, duke of Enghien (later known as le Grand Condé) at the Battle of Lens, Mazarin, on Queen Anne's insistence, arrested certain members in a show of force. The most important arrest, from Anne's point of view, concerned Pierre Broussel, one of the most important leaders in the Parliament of Paris.

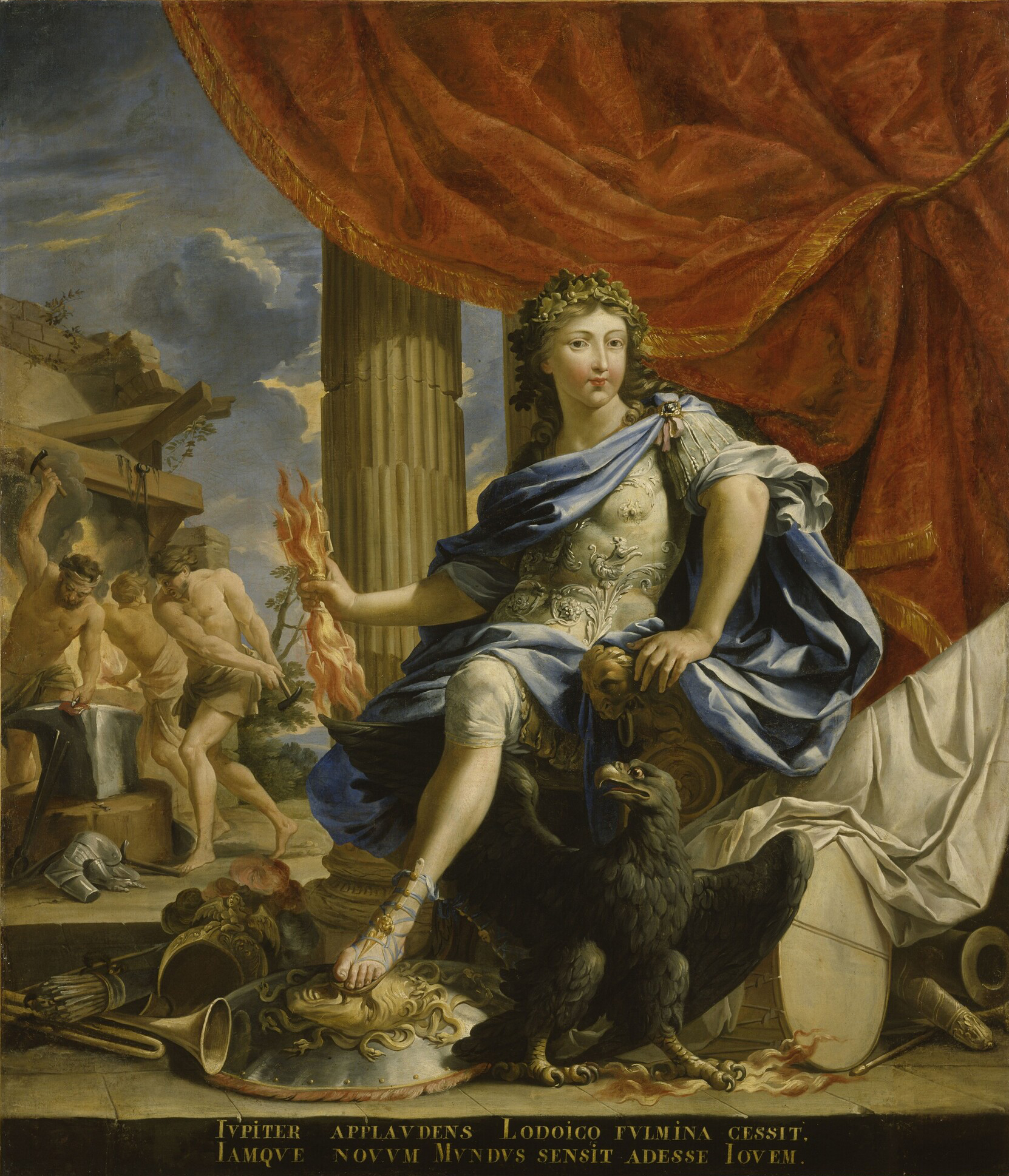
1655 portrait of Louis, the Victor of the Fronde, portrayed as the god Jupiter

People in France were complaining about the expansion of royal authority, the high rate of taxation, and the reduction of the authority of the Parlement de Paris and other regional representative entities. Paris erupted in rioting as a result, and Anne was forced, under intense pressure, to free Broussel. Moreover, on the night of 9–10 February 1651, when Louis was twelve, a mob of angry Parisians broke into the royal palace and demanded to see their king. Led into the royal bed-chamber, they gazed upon Louis, who was feigning sleep, were appeased, and then quietly departed. The threat to the royal family prompted Anne to flee Paris with the king and his courtiers.

Shortly thereafter, the conclusion of the Peace of Westphalia allowed Condé's army to return to aid Louis and his court. Condé's family was close to Anne at that time, and he agreed to help her attempt to restore the king's authority. The queen's army, headed by Condé, attacked the rebels in Paris; the rebels were under the political control of Anne's old friend Marie de Rohan. Beaufort, who had escaped from the prison where Anne had incarcerated him five years before, was the military leader in Paris, under the nominal control of Conti. After a few battles, a political compromise was reached; the Peace of Rueil was signed, and the court returned to Paris.

Unfortunately for Anne, her partial victory depended on Condé, who wanted to control the queen and destroy Mazarin's influence. It was Condé's sister who pushed him to turn against the queen. After striking a deal with her old friend Marie de Rohan, who was able to impose the nomination of Charles de l'Aubespine, marquess of Châteauneuf as minister of justice, Anne arrested Condé, his brother Armand de Bourbon, Prince of Conti, and the husband of their sister Anne Genevieve de Bourbon, duchess of Longueville. This situation did not last long, and Mazarin's unpopularity led to the creation of a coalition headed mainly by Marie de Rohan and the duchess of Longueville. This aristocratic coalition was strong enough to liberate the princes, exile Mazarin, and impose a condition of virtual house arrest on Queen Anne.

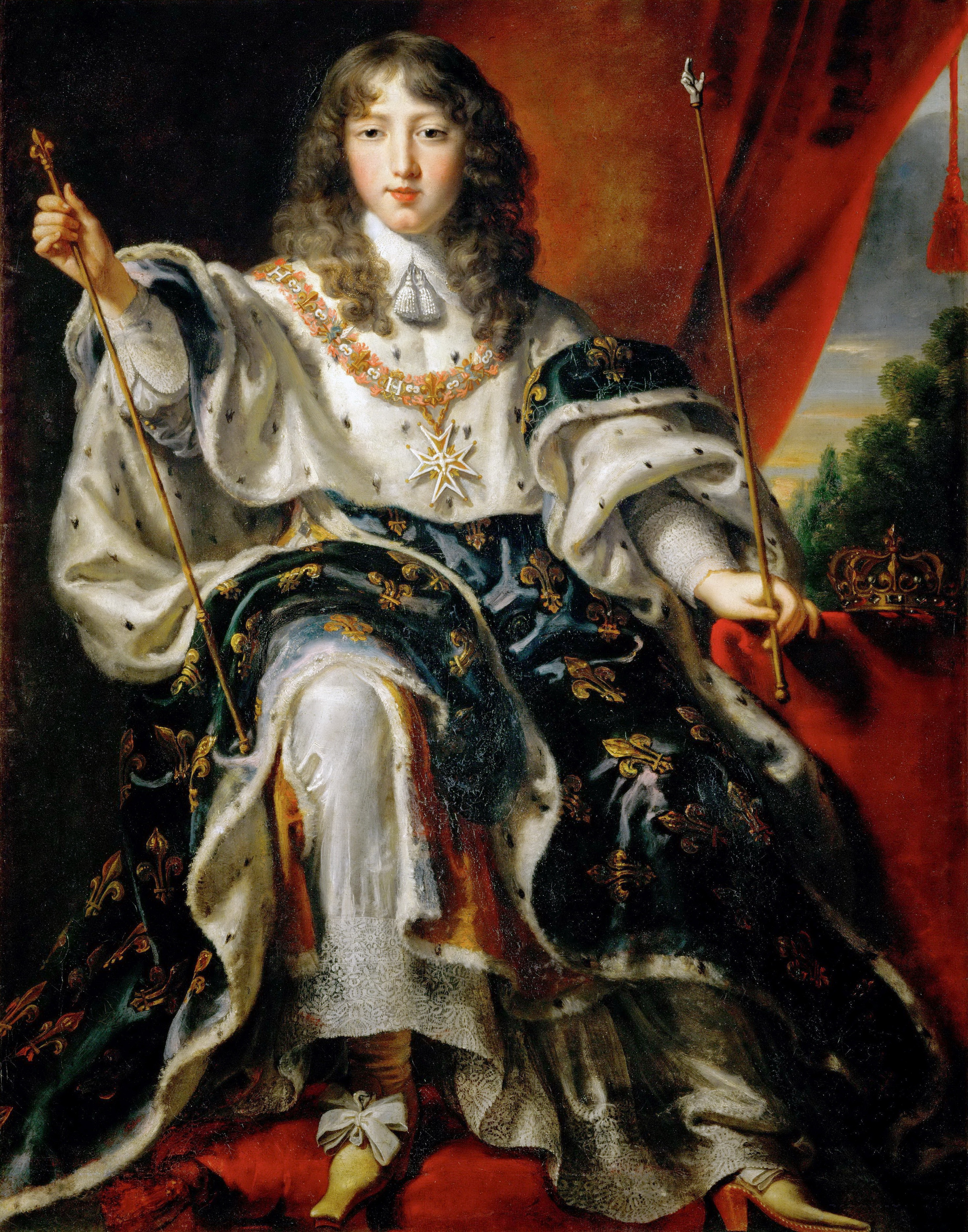
Portrait by Justus van Egmont between the years 1649–1652.

All these events were witnessed by Louis and largely explained his later distrust of Paris and the higher aristocracy. "In one sense, Louis's childhood came to an end with the outbreak of the Fronde. It was not only that life became insecure and unpleasant – a fate meted out to many children in all ages – but that Louis had to be taken into the confidence of his mother and Mazarin on political and military matters of which he could have no deep understanding". "The family home became at times a near-prison when Paris had to be abandoned, not in carefree outings to other chateaux but in humiliating flights". The royal family was driven out of Paris twice in this manner, and at one point Louis XIV and Anne were held under virtual arrest in the royal palace in Paris. The Fronde years planted in Louis a hatred of Paris and a consequent determination to move out of the ancient capital as soon as possible, never to return.

Just as the first Fronde (the Parliamentary Fronde of 1648–1649) ended, a second one (the Fronde of the Princes of 1650–1653) began. Unlike that which preceded it, tales of sordid intrigue and half-hearted warfare characterized this second phase of upper-class insurrection. To the aristocracy, this rebellion represented a protest for the reversal of their political demotion from vassals to courtiers. It was headed by the highest-ranking French nobles, among them Louis's uncle Gaston, Duke of Orléans and first cousin Anne Marie Louise d'Orléans, Duchess of Montpensier, known as la Grande Mademoiselle; Princes of the Blood such as Condé, his brother Armand de Bourbon, Prince of Conti, and their sister the Duchess of Longueville; dukes of legitimised royal descent, such as Henri, Duke of Longueville, and François, Duke of Beaufort; so-called "foreign princes" such as Frédéric Maurice, Duke of Bouillon, his brother Turenne (the Marshal of France), and Marie de Rohan, Duchess of Chevreuse; and scions of France's oldest families, such as François de La Rochefoucauld.

Queen Anne played the most important role in defeating the Fronde because she wanted to transfer absolute authority to her son. In addition, most of the princes refused to deal with Mazarin, who went into exile for a number of years. The Frondeurs claimed to act on Louis's behalf, and in his real interest, against his mother and Mazarin.

Queen Anne had a very close relationship with the Cardinal, and many observers believed that Mazarin became Louis XIV's stepfather by a secret marriage to Queen Anne. However, Louis's coming-of-age and subsequent coronation deprived them of the Frondeurs' pretext for revolt. The Fronde thus gradually lost steam and ended in 1653, when Mazarin returned triumphantly from exile. From that time until his death, Mazarin was in charge of foreign and financial policy without the daily supervision of Anne, who was no longer regent.

During this period, Louis fell in love with Mazarin's niece Marie Mancini, but Anne and Mazarin ended the king's infatuation by sending Mancini away from court to be married in Italy. While Mazarin might have been tempted for a short time to marry his niece to the King of France, Queen Anne was absolutely against this; she wanted to marry her son to the daughter of her brother, Philip IV of Spain, for both dynastic and political reasons. Mazarin soon supported the Queen's position because he knew that her support for his power and his foreign policy depended on making peace with Spain from a strong position and on the Spanish marriage. Additionally, Mazarin's relations with Marie Mancini were not good, and he did not trust her to support his position. All of Louis's tears and his supplications to his mother did not make her change her mind. The Spanish marriage would be very important both for its role in ending the war between France and Spain, because many of the claims and objectives of Louis's foreign policy for the next 50 years would be based upon this marriage, and because it was through this marriage that the Spanish throne would ultimately be delivered to the House of Bourbon.

== Personal reign and reforms ==
=== Coming of age and early reforms ===
Royal monogram

Louis XIV was declared to have reached the age of majority on the 7th of September 1651. On the death of Mazarin, in March 1661, Louis personally took the reins of government and astonished his court by declaring that he would rule without a chief minister:

Up to this moment I have been pleased to entrust the government of my affairs to the late Cardinal. It is now time that I govern them myself. You [secretaries and ministers] will assist me with your counsels when I ask for them. I request and order you to seal no orders except by my command ... I order you not to sign anything, not even a passport ... without my command; to render account to me personally each day and to favor no one.

Capitalizing on the widespread public yearning for peace and order after decades of foreign and civil strife, the young king consolidated central political authority at the expense of the feudal aristocracy. Praising his ability to choose and encourage men of talent, the historian Chateaubriand noted: "it is the voice of genius of all kinds which sounds from the tomb of Louis".

Louis began his personal reign with administrative and fiscal reforms. In 1661, the treasury verged on bankruptcy. To rectify the situation, Louis chose Jean-Baptiste Colbert as Controller-General of Finances in 1665. However, Louis first had to neutralize Nicolas Fouquet, the powerful Superintendent of Finances. Although Fouquet's financial indiscretions were not very different from Mazarin's before him or Colbert's after him, his ambition worried Louis. He lavishly entertained the king at the opulent château of Vaux-le-Vicomte, flaunting a wealth which could hardly have accumulated except through embezzlement of government funds.

Fouquet appeared eager to succeed Mazarin and Richelieu in power, and he indiscreetly purchased and privately fortified the remote island of Belle Île. These acts sealed his doom. Fouquet was charged with embezzlement; the Parlement found him guilty and sentenced him to exile; and finally Louis altered the sentence to life imprisonment.

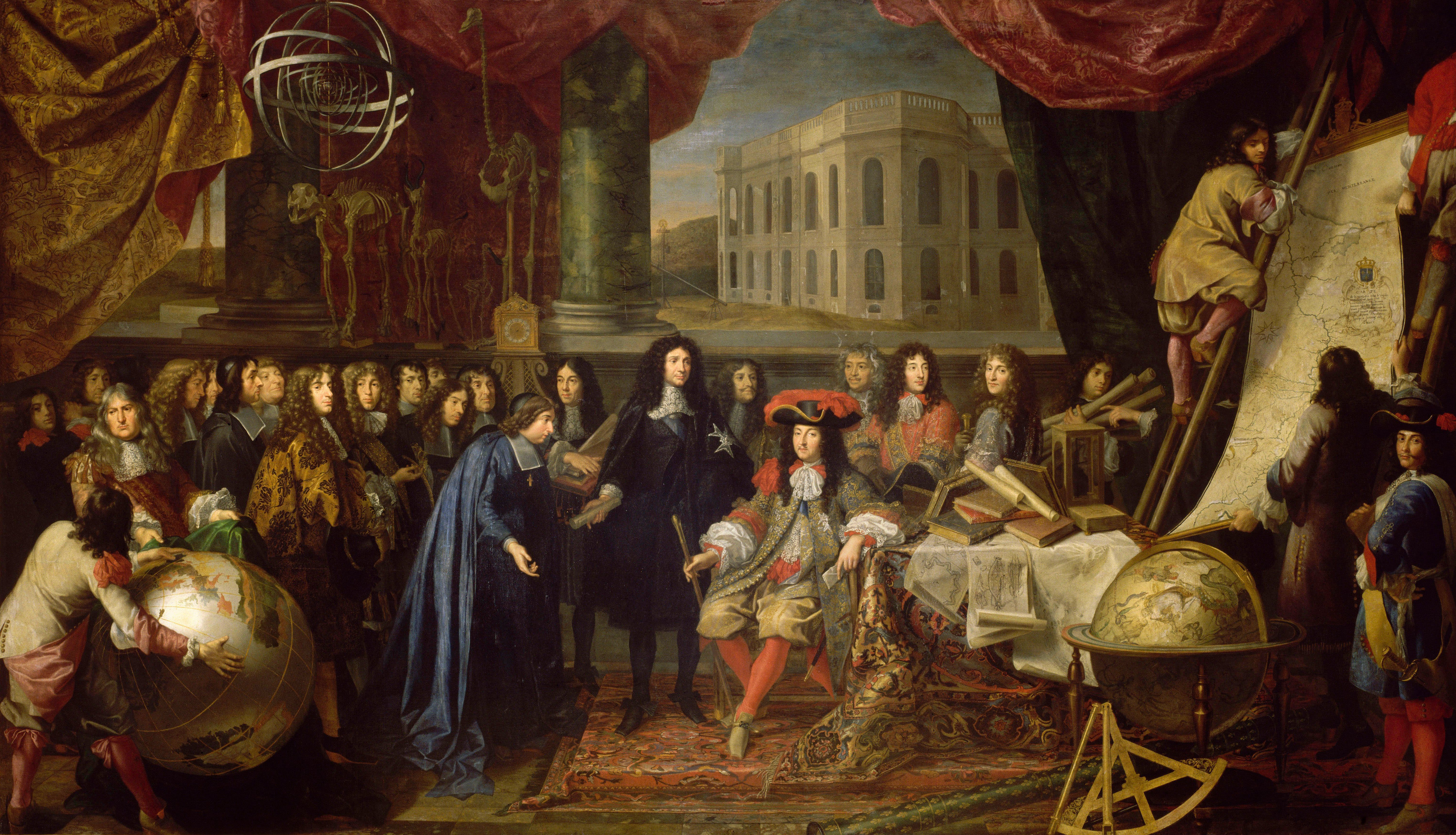
Members of the Académie des sciences with Louis in 1667; in the background appears the new Paris Observatory.

Fouquet's downfall gave Colbert a free hand to reduce the national debt through more efficient taxation. The principal taxes included the aides and douanes (both customs duties), the gabelle (salt tax), and the taille (land tax). The taille was reduced at first, and certain tax-collection contracts were auctioned instead of being sold privately to a favoured few. Financial officials were required to keep regular accounts, revising inventories and removing unauthorized exemptions: up to 1661 only 10 per cent of income from the royal domain reached the king. Reform had to overcome vested interests: the taille was collected by officers of the Crown who had purchased their post at a high price, and punishment of abuses necessarily lowered the value of the purchase. Nevertheless, Colbert achieved excellent results, with the deficit of 1661 turning into a surplus by 1666, with interest on the debt decreasing from 52 million to 24 million livres. The taille was reduced to 42 million in 1661 and 35 million in 1665, while revenue from indirect taxation progressed from 26 million to 55 million. The revenues of the royal domain were raised from 80,000 livres in 1661 to 5.5 million in 1671. In 1661, the receipts were equivalent to 26 million British pounds, of which 10 million reached the treasury. The expenditure was around 18 million pounds, leaving a deficit of 8 million. In 1667, the net receipts had risen to 20 million pounds sterling, while expenditure had fallen to 11 million, leaving a surplus of 9 million pounds.

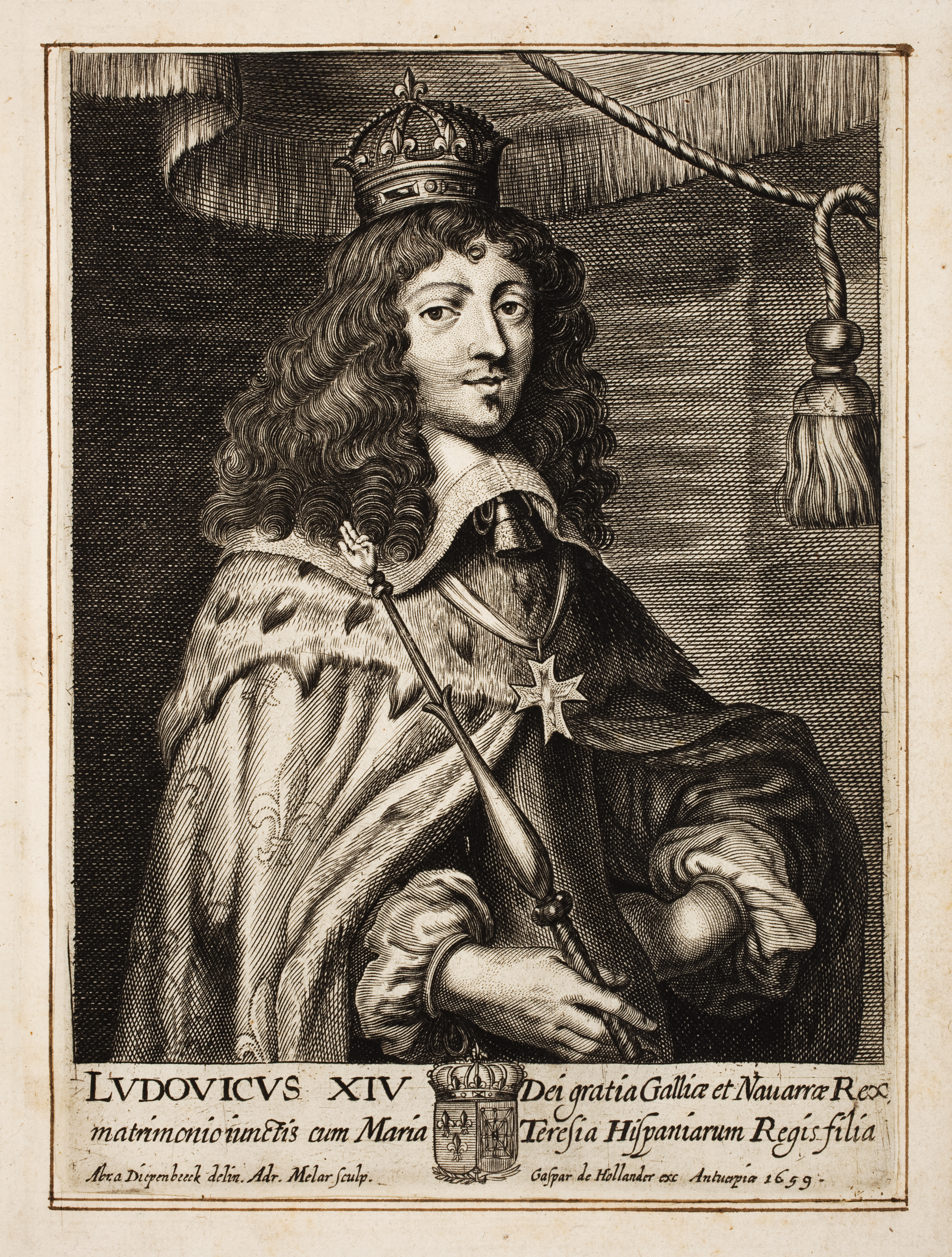
Engraving of Louis XIV

Money was the essential support of the reorganized and enlarged army, the panoply of Versailles, and the growing civil administration. Finance had always been the weakness of the French monarchy: tax collection was costly and inefficient; direct taxes dwindled as they passed through the hands of many intermediate officials; and indirect taxes were collected by private contractors called tax farmers who made a handsome profit.

The main economic weakness arose from an old bargain between the French crown and nobility: the king might raise taxes on the nation without consent if only he exempted the nobility. Only the "unprivileged" classes paid direct taxes, which came to mean the peasants only, as most bourgeois finagled exemptions in one way or another. The system laid the whole burden of state expenses on the backs of the poor and powerless. After 1700, with the support of Louis's pious secret wife Madame de Maintenon, the king was persuaded to change his fiscal policy. Though willing enough to tax the nobles, Louis feared the political concessions which they would demand in return. Only towards the close of his reign under the extreme exigency of war, was he able, for the first time in French history, to impose direct taxes on the aristocracy. This was a step toward equality before the law and toward sound public finance, though it was predictably diminished by concessions and exemptions won by the insistent efforts of nobles and bourgeois.

Louis and Colbert also had wide-ranging plans to grow French commerce and trade. Colbert's mercantilist administration established new industries and encouraged manufacturers and inventors, such as the Lyon silk manufacturers and the Gobelins tapestry manufactory. He invited manufacturers and artisans from all over Europe to France, such as Murano glassmakers, Swedish ironworkers, and Dutch shipbuilders. He aimed to decrease imports while increasing French exports, hence reducing the net outflow of precious metals from France.

Louis instituted reforms in military administration through Michel le Tellier and his son François-Michel le Tellier, successive Marquis de Louvois. They helped to curb the independent spirit of the nobility, imposing order on them at court and in the army. Gone were the days when generals protracted war at the frontiers while bickering over precedence and ignoring orders from the capital and the larger strategic picture, with the old military aristocracy (noblesse d'épée, nobility of the sword) monopolizing senior military positions and the higher ranks. Louvois modernized the army and reorganised it into a professional, disciplined, well-trained force. He was devoted to the soldiers' material well-being and morale, and even tried to direct campaigns.

=== Relations with the major colonies ===
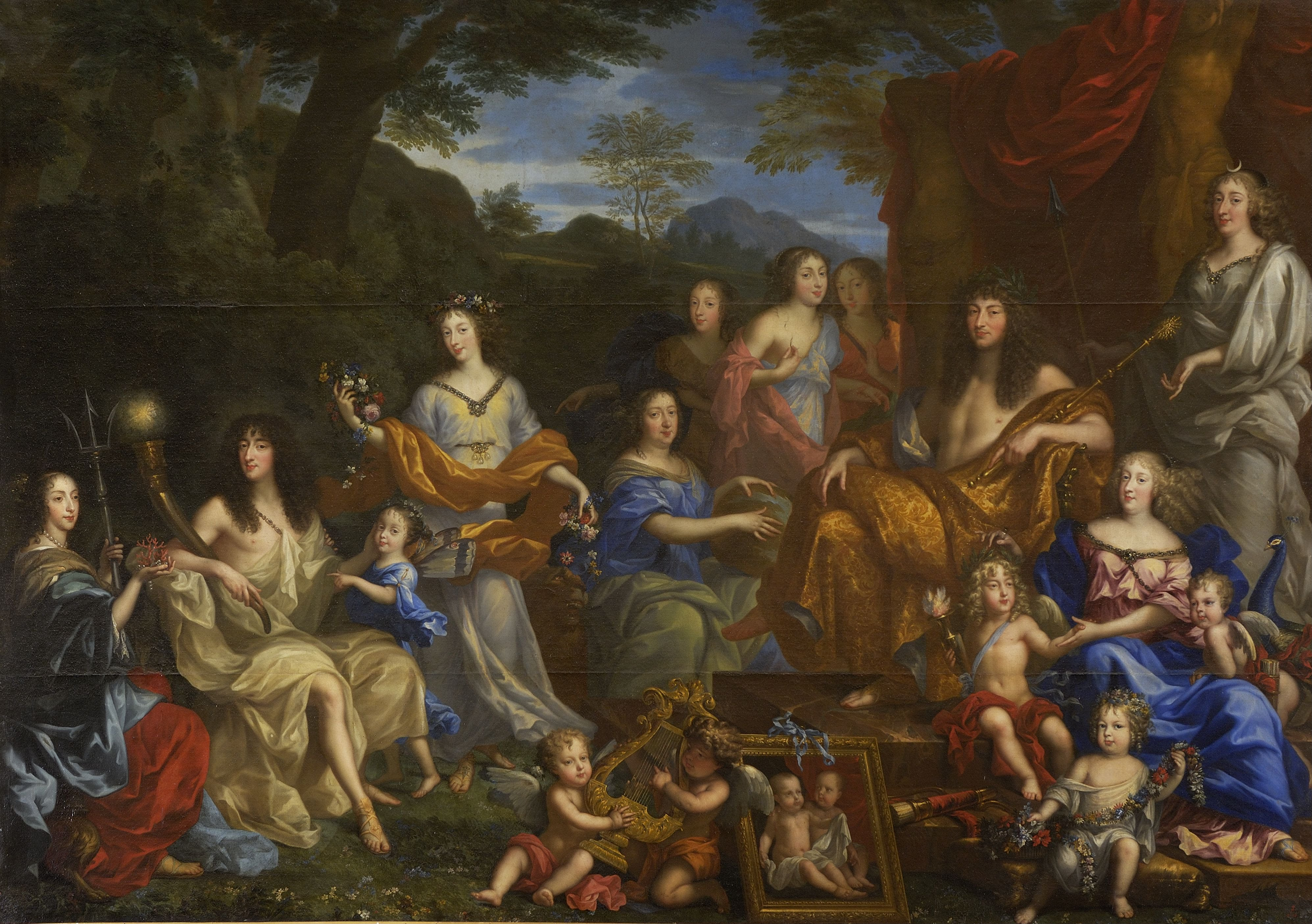
Louis and his family portrayed as Roman gods in a 1670 painting by Jean Nocret. Left to right: Louis's aunt, Henriette-Marie; his brother, Philippe, Duke of Orléans; the Duke's daughter, Marie Louise d'Orléans, and wife, Henriette-Anne Stuart; the Queen-mother, Anne of Austria; three daughters of Gaston, Duke of Orléans; Louis XIV; the Dauphin Louis; Queen Maria Theresa; Anne Marie Louise d'Orléans, "la Grande Mademoiselle".

Louis's legal reforms were enacted in his numerous Great Ordinances. Prior to that, France was a patchwork of legal systems, with as many traditional legal regimes as there were provinces, and two co-existing legal systems—customary law in the north and Roman civil law in the south. The Great Ordinance of Civil Procedure of 1667, the Code Louis, was a comprehensive legal code imposing a uniform regulation of civil procedure throughout the kingdom. Among other things, it prescribed baptismal, marriage and death records in the state's registers, not the church's, and it strictly regulated the right of the Parlements to remonstrate. The Code Louis later became the basis for the Napoleonic Code, which in turn inspired many modern legal codes.

One of Louis's more infamous decrees was the Great Ordinance on the Colonies of 1685, the Code Noir (black code). Although it sanctioned slavery, it attempted to humanise the practice by prohibiting the separation of families. Additionally, in the colonies, only Roman Catholics could own slaves, and these had to be baptised.

Louis ruled through a number of councils:

- Conseil d'en haut ("High Council", concerning the most important matters of state)—composed of the king, the crown prince, the controller-general of finances, and the secretaries of state in charge of various departments. The members of that council were called ministers of state.
- Conseil des dépêches ("Council of Messages", concerning notices and administrative reports from the provinces).
- Conseil de Conscience ("Council of Conscience", concerning religious affairs and episcopal appointments).
- Conseil royal des finances ("Royal Council of Finances") headed by the chef du conseil des finances (an honorary post in most cases)—this was one of the few posts in the council available to the high aristocracy.

== Early wars in the Low Countries ==
=== Spain ===
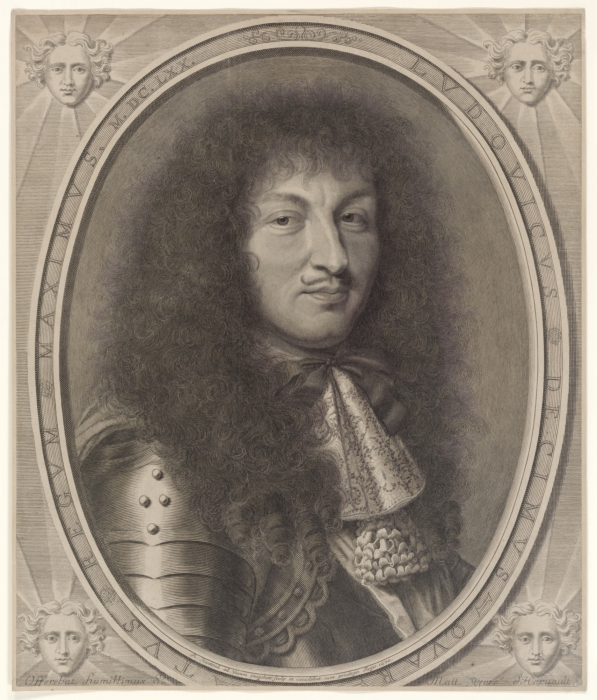
Louis XIV in 1670, engraved portrait by Robert Nanteuil

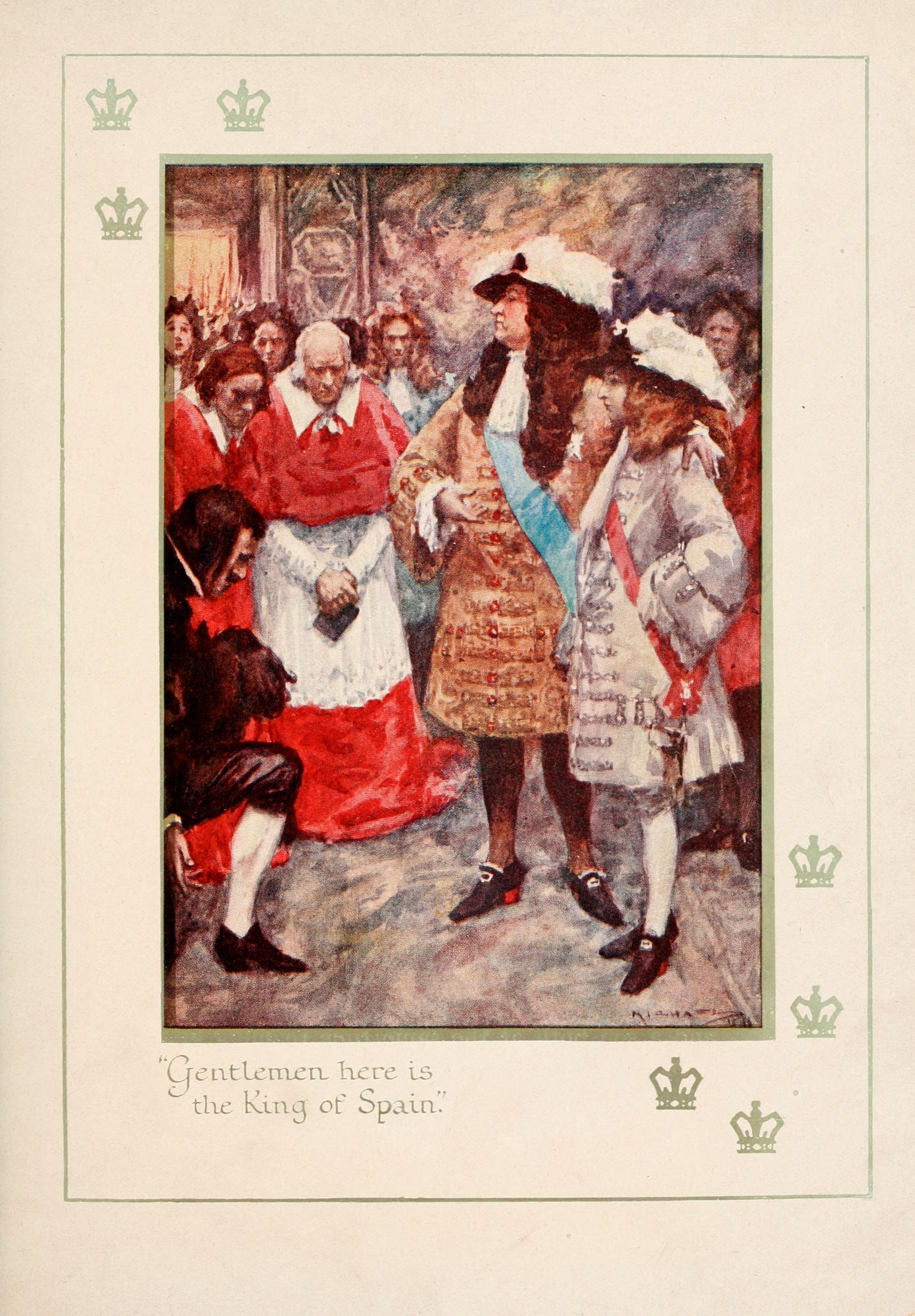
The future Philip V being introduced as King of Spain by his grandfather, Louis XIV

The death of Louis's maternal uncle King Philip IV of Spain in 1665 precipitated the War of Devolution. In 1660, Louis had married Philip IV's eldest daughter, Maria Theresa, as one of the provisions of the 1659 Treaty of the Pyrenees. The marriage treaty specified that Maria Theresa was to renounce all claims to Spanish territory for herself and all her descendants. Mazarin and Lionne, however, made the renunciation conditional on the full payment of a Spanish dowry of 500,000 écus. The dowry was never paid and would later play a part persuading his maternal first cousin Charles II of Spain to leave his empire to Philip, Duke of Anjou (later Philip V of Spain), the grandson of Louis XIV and Maria Theresa.

The War of Devolution did not focus on the payment of the dowry; rather, the lack of payment was what Louis XIV used as a pretext for nullifying Maria Theresa's renunciation of her claims, allowing the land to "devolve" to him. In Brabant (the location of the land in dispute), children of first marriages traditionally were not disadvantaged by their parents' remarriages and still inherited property. Louis's wife was Philip IV's daughter by his first marriage, while the new king of Spain, Charles II, was his son by a subsequent marriage. Thus, Brabant allegedly "devolved" to Maria Theresa, justifying France to attack the Spanish Netherlands.

=== Relations with the Dutch ===
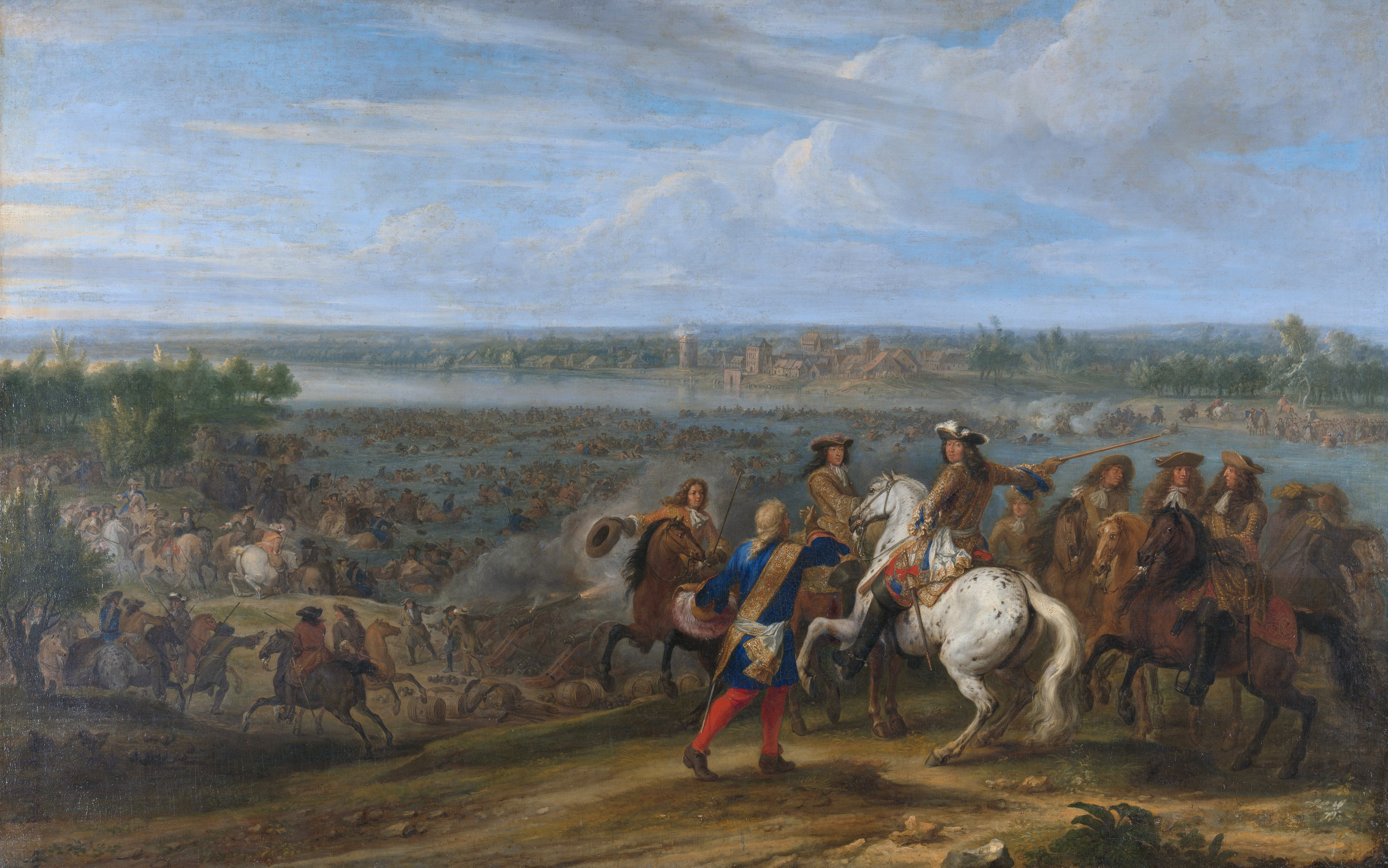
The Battle of Tolhuis, Louis XIV crosses the Lower Rhine at Lobith on 12 June 1672; Rijksmuseum Amsterdam

During the Eighty Years' War (1568-1648) with Spain, France supported the Dutch Republic as part of a general policy of opposing Habsburg power. Johan de Witt, Dutch Grand Pensionary from 1653 to 1672, viewed this as crucial for Dutch security and a counterweight against his domestic Orangist opponents. Louis provided support in the 1665-1667 Second Anglo-Dutch War but used the opportunity to launch the War of Devolution in 1667. This captured Franche-Comté and much of the Spanish Netherlands; French expansion in this area was a direct threat to Dutch economic interests.

The Dutch opened talks with Charles II of England on a common diplomatic front against France, leading to the Triple Alliance, between England, the Dutch and Sweden. The threat of an escalation and a secret treaty to divide Spanish possessions with Emperor Leopold, the other major claimant to the throne of Spain, led Louis to relinquish many of his gains in the 1668 Treaty of Aix-la-Chapelle.

Louis placed little reliance on his agreement with Leopold and as it was now clear French and Dutch aims were in direct conflict, he decided to first defeat the Republic, then seize the Spanish Netherlands. This required breaking up the Triple Alliance; he paid Sweden to remain neutral and signed the 1670 Secret Treaty of Dover with Charles, an Anglo-French alliance against the Dutch Republic. In May 1672, France invaded the Republic, supported by Münster and the Electorate of Cologne.

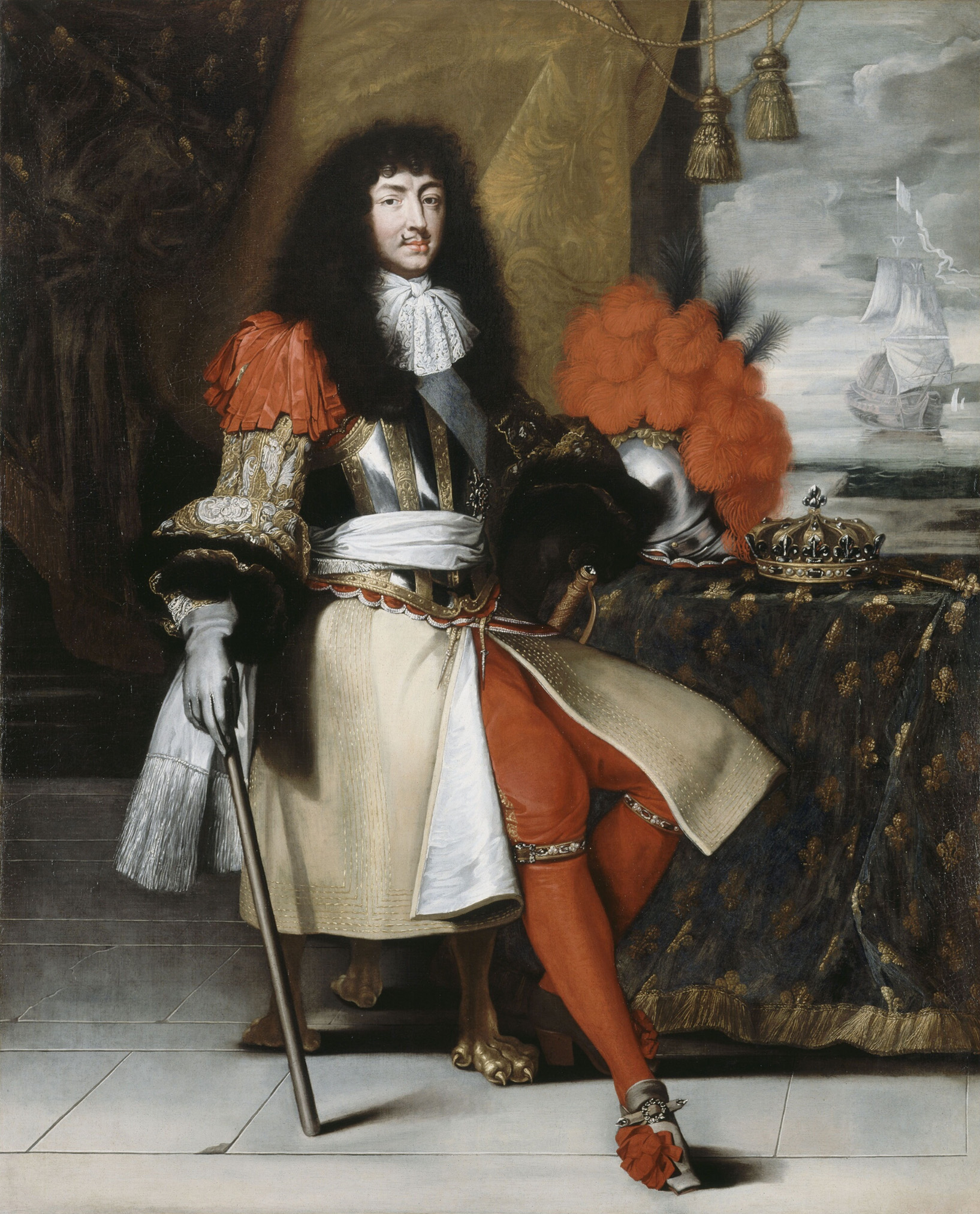
Louis XIV, 1670, by Claude Lefèbvre

Rapid French advance led to a coup that toppled De Witt and brought William III to power. Leopold viewed French expansion into the Rhineland as an increasing threat, especially after they seized the strategic Duchy of Lorraine in 1670. The prospect of Dutch defeat led Leopold to an alliance with Brandenburg-Prussia on 23 June, followed by another with the Republic on 25th. Although Brandenburg was forced out of the war by the June 1673 Treaty of Vossem, in August an anti-French alliance was formed by the Dutch, Spain, Emperor Leopold and the Duke of Lorraine.

The French alliance was deeply unpopular in England, and only more so after the disappointing battles against Michiel de Ruyter's fleet. Charles II of England made peace with the Dutch in the February 1674 Treaty of Westminster. However, French armies held significant advantages over their opponents; an undivided command, talented generals like Turenne, Condé and Luxembourg and vastly superior logistics. Reforms introduced by Louvois, the Secretary of War, helped maintain large field armies that could be mobilised much more quickly, allowing them to mount offensives in early spring before their opponents were ready.

The French were nevertheless forced to retreat from most of the Dutch Republic, which deeply shocked Louis; he retreated to St Germain for a time, where no one, except a few intimates, was allowed to disturb him. French military advantages allowed them however to hold their ground in Alsace and the Spanish Netherlands while retaking Franche-Comté. By 1678, mutual exhaustion led to the Treaty of Nijmegen, which was generally settled in France's favour and allowed Louis to intervene in the Scanian War. Despite the military defeat, his ally Sweden regained much of what it had lost under the 1679 treaties of Saint-Germain-en-Laye, Fontainebleau and Lund imposed on Denmark–Norway and Brandenburg. Yet Louis's two primary goals, the destruction of the Dutch Republic and the conquest of the Spanish Netherlands, had failed.

Louis was at the height of his power, but at the cost of uniting his opponents; this increased as he continued his expansion. In 1679, he dismissed his foreign minister Simon Arnauld, marquis de Pomponne, because he was seen as having compromised too much with the allies. Louis maintained the strength of his army, but in his next series of territorial claims avoided using military force alone. Rather, he combined it with legal pretexts in his efforts to augment the boundaries of his kingdom. Contemporary treaties were intentionally phrased ambiguously. Louis established the Chambers of Reunion to determine the full extent of his rights and obligations under those treaties.

Silver coin of Louis XIV, dated 1674
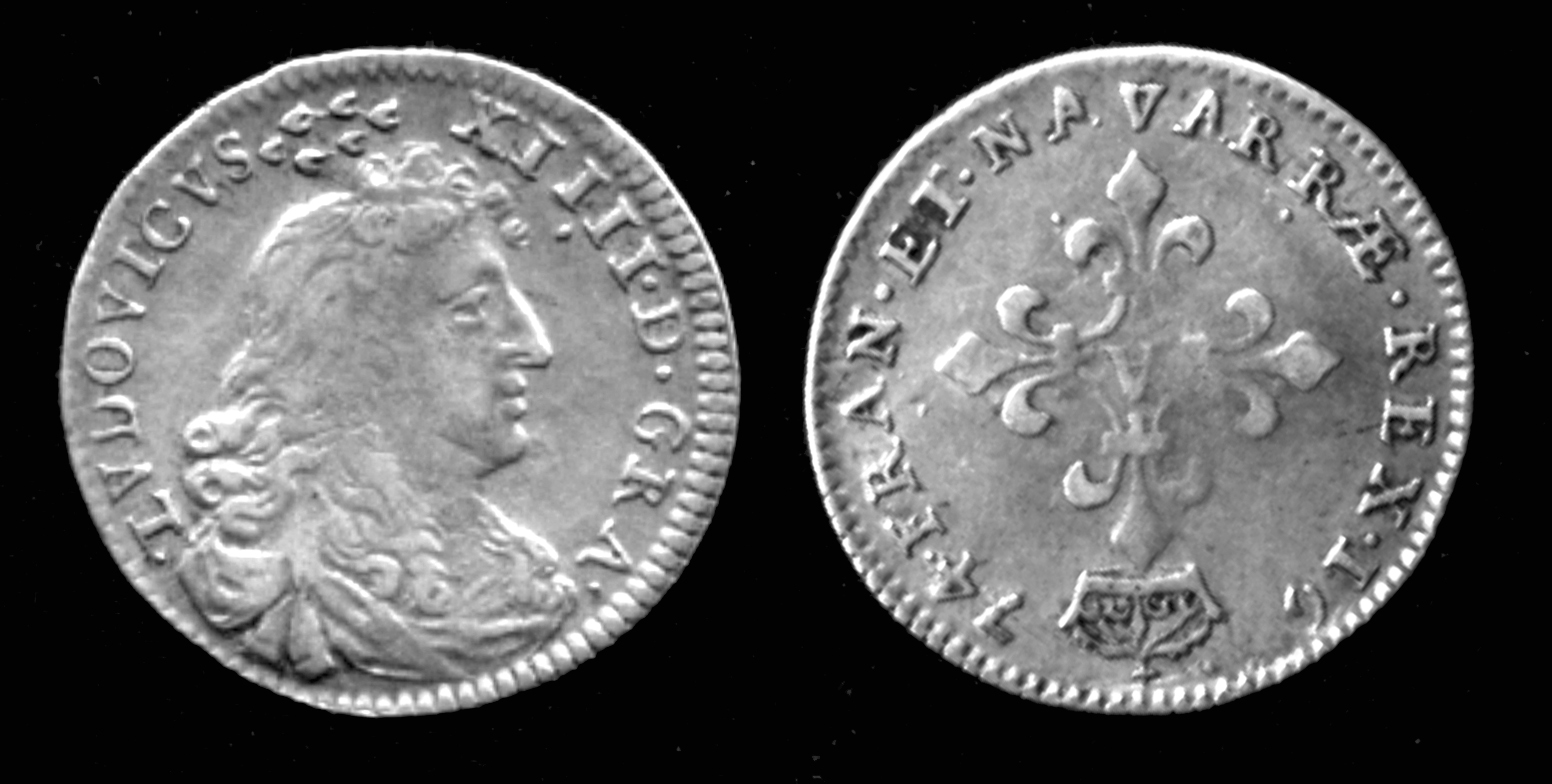
First side of the image: Obverse. The Latin inscription is LVDOVICVS XIIII D[EI] GRA[TIA] ("Louis XIV, by the grace of God").
Second side of the image: Reverse. The Latin inscription is FRAN[CIÆ] ET NAVARRÆ REX 1674 ("King of France and of Navarre, 1674").

Cities and territories, such as Luxembourg and Casale, were prized for their strategic positions on the frontier and access to important waterways. Louis also sought Strasbourg, an important strategic crossing on the left bank of the Rhine and theretofore a Free Imperial City of the Holy Roman Empire, annexing it and other territories in 1681. Although a part of Alsace, Strasbourg was not part of Habsburg-ruled Alsace and was thus not ceded to France in the Peace of Westphalia.

Following these annexations, Spain declared war, precipitating the War of the Reunions. However, the Spanish were rapidly defeated because the Emperor (distracted by the Great Turkish War) abandoned them, and the Dutch only supported them minimally. By the Truce of Ratisbon, in 1684, Spain was forced to acquiesce in the French occupation of most of the conquered territories, for 20 years.

Louis's policy of the Réunions may have raised France to its greatest size and power during his reign, but it alienated much of Europe. This poor public opinion was compounded by French actions off the Barbary Coast and at Genoa. First, Louis had Algiers and Tripoli, two Barbary pirate strongholds, bombarded to obtain a favourable treaty and the liberation of Christian slaves. Next, in 1684, a punitive mission was launched against Genoa in retaliation for its support for Spain in previous wars. Although the Genoese submitted, and the Doge led an official mission of apology to Versailles, France gained a reputation for brutality and arrogance. European apprehension at growing French might and the realisation of the extent of the dragonnades' effect (discussed below) led many states to abandon their alliances with France. Accordingly, by the late 1680s, France became increasingly isolated in Europe.

=== Non-European relations and the colonies ===
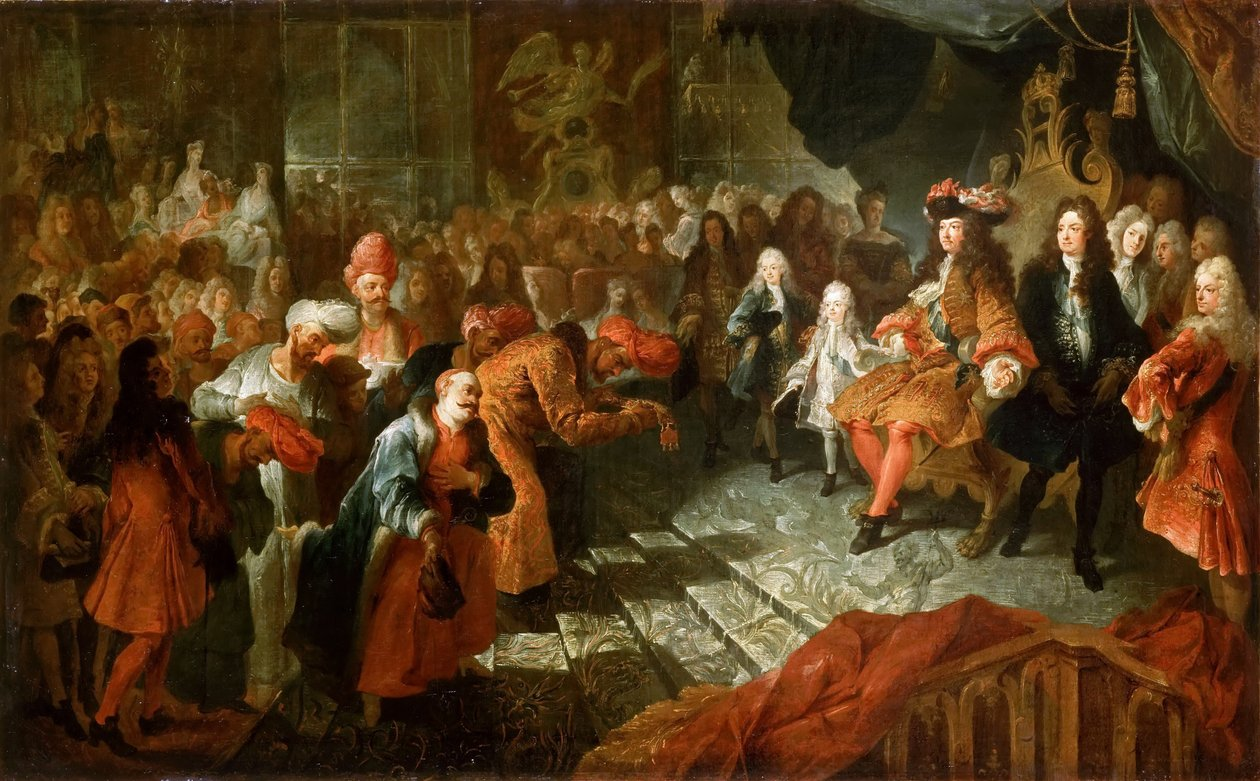
The Persian embassy to Louis XIV sent by Soltan Hoseyn in 1715. Ambassade de Perse auprès de Louis XIV, studio of Antoine Coypel.

French colonies multiplied in Africa, the Americas, and Asia during Louis's reign, and French explorers made important discoveries in North America. In 1673, Louis Jolliet and Jacques Marquette discovered the Mississippi River. In 1682, René-Robert Cavelier, Sieur de La Salle, followed the Mississippi to the Gulf of Mexico and claimed the vast Mississippi basin in Louis's name, calling it Louisiane. French trading posts were also established in India, at Chandernagore and Pondicherry, and in the Indian Ocean at Île Bourbon. Throughout these regions, Louis and Colbert embarked on an extensive program of architecture and urbanism meant to reflect the styles of Versailles and Paris and the 'gloire' of the realm.

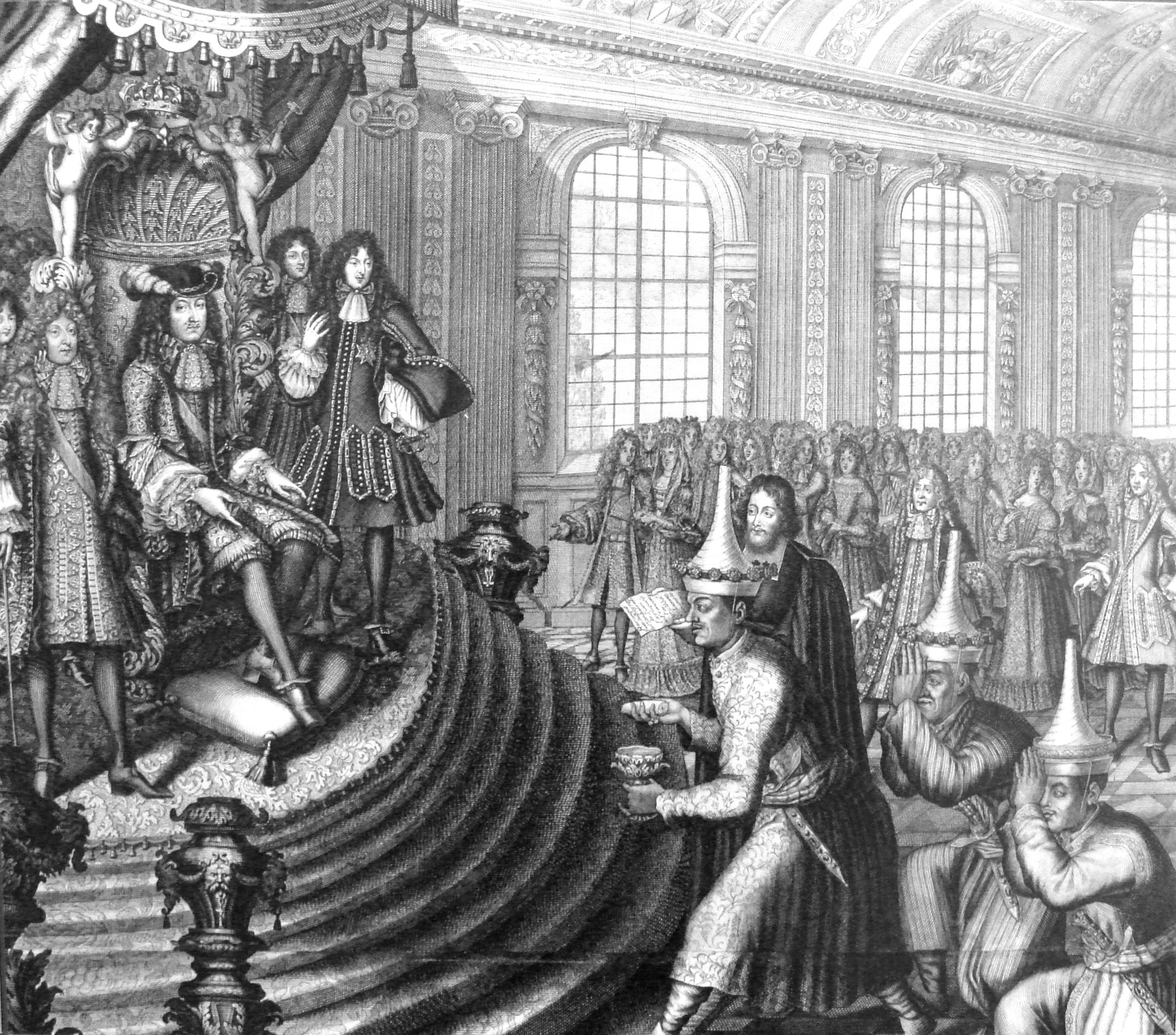
Siamese embassy of King Narai to Louis XIV in 1686, led by Kosa Pan. Engraving by Nicolas Larmessin.

Meanwhile, diplomatic relations were initiated with distant countries. In 1669, Suleiman Aga led an Ottoman embassy to revive the old Franco-Ottoman alliance. Then, in 1682, after the reception of the Moroccan embassy of Mohammed Tenim in France, Moulay Ismail, Sultan of Morocco, allowed French consular and commercial establishments in his country. In 1699, Louis once again received a Moroccan ambassador, Abdallah bin Aisha, and in 1715, he received a Persian embassy led by Mohammad Reza Beg.

From farther afield, Siam dispatched an embassy in 1684, reciprocated by the French magnificently the next year under Alexandre, Chevalier de Chaumont. This, in turn, was succeeded by another Siamese embassy under Kosa Pan, superbly received at Versailles in 1686. Louis then sent another embassy in 1687, under Simon de la Loubère, and French influence grew at the Siamese court, which granted Mergui as a naval base to France. However, the death of Narai, King of Ayutthaya, the execution of his pro-French minister Constantine Phaulkon, and the siege of Bangkok in 1688 ended this era of French influence.

France also attempted to participate actively in Jesuit missions to China. To break the Portuguese dominance there, Louis sent Jesuit missionaries to the court of the Kangxi Emperor in 1685: Jean de Fontaney, Joachim Bouvet, Jean-François Gerbillon, Louis Le Comte, and Claude de Visdelou. Louis also received a Chinese Jesuit, Michael Shen Fu-Tsung, at Versailles in 1684.

== Height of power ==
=== Centralisation of power ===
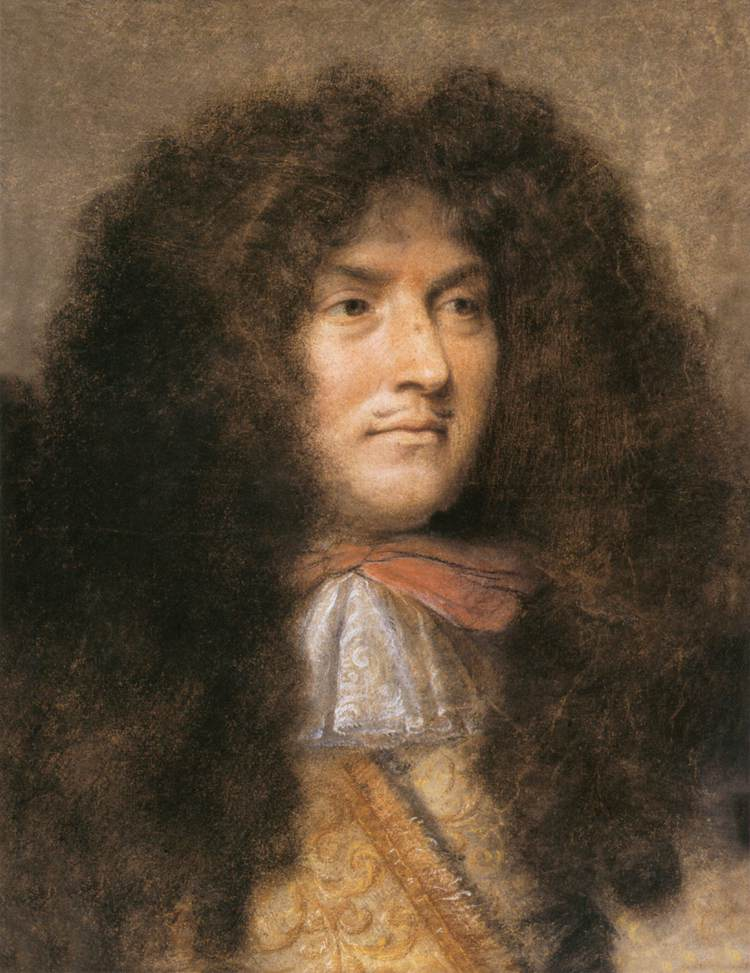
Portrait of Louis XIV (gray pastel on paper by Charles Le Brun, 1667, Louvre Museum)

By the early 1680s, Louis had greatly augmented French influence in the world. Domestically, he successfully increased the influence of the crown and its authority over the church and aristocracy, thus consolidating absolute monarchy in France.

Louis initially supported traditional Gallicanism, which limited papal authority in France, and convened an Assembly of the French clergy in November 1681. Before its dissolution eight months later, the Assembly had accepted the Declaration of the Clergy of France, which increased royal authority at the expense of papal power. Without royal approval, bishops could not leave France, and appeals could not be made to the pope. Additionally, government officials could not be excommunicated for acts committed in pursuance of their duties. Although the king could not make ecclesiastical law, all papal regulations without royal assent were invalid in France. Unsurprisingly, the Pope repudiated the Declaration.

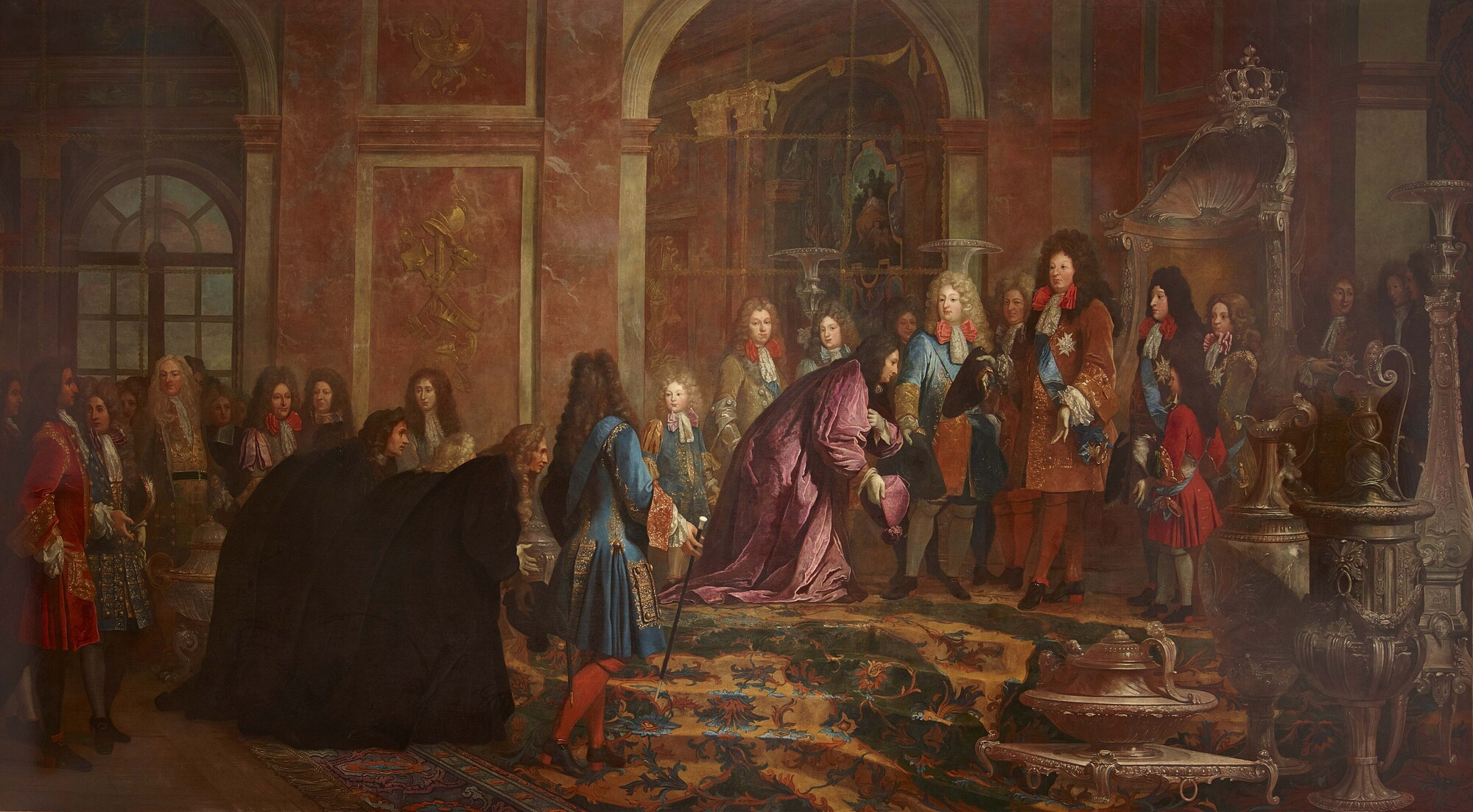
Louis receiving the Doge of Genoa at Versailles on 15 May 1685, following the Bombardment of Genoa. (Reparation faite à Louis XIV par le Doge de Gênes. 15 mai 1685 by Claude Guy Halle, Versailles.)

By attaching nobles to his court at Versailles, Louis achieved increased control over the French aristocracy. According to historian Philip Mansel, the king turned the palace into:

an irresistible combination of marriage market, employment agency and entertainment capital of aristocratic Europe, boasting the best theatre, opera, music, gambling, sex and (most important) hunting.

Apartments were built to house those willing to pay court to the king. However, the pensions and privileges necessary to live in a style appropriate to their rank were only possible by waiting constantly on Louis. For this purpose, an elaborate court ritual was created wherein the king became the centre of attention and was observed throughout the day by the public. With his excellent memory, Louis could then see who attended him at court and who was absent, facilitating the subsequent distribution of favours and positions. Another tool Louis used to control his nobility was censorship, which often involved the opening of letters to discern their author's opinion of the government and king. Moreover, by entertaining, impressing, and domesticating them with extravagant luxury and other distractions, Louis not only cultivated public opinion of him, but he also ensured the aristocracy remained under his scrutiny.

Louis's extravagance at Versailles extended far beyond the scope of elaborate court rituals. He took delivery of an African elephant as a gift from the king of Portugal. He encouraged leading nobles to live at Versailles. This, along with the prohibition of private armies, prevented them from passing time on their own estates and in their regional power bases, from which they historically waged local wars and plotted resistance to royal authority. Louis thus compelled and seduced the old military aristocracy (the "nobility of the sword") into becoming his ceremonial courtiers, further weakening their power. In their place, he raised commoners or the more recently ennobled bureaucratic aristocracy (the "nobility of the robe"). He judged that royal authority thrived more surely by filling high executive and administrative positions with these men because they could be more easily dismissed than nobles of ancient lineage and entrenched influence. It is believed that Louis's policies were rooted in his experiences during the Fronde, when men of high birth readily took up the rebel cause against their king, who was actually the kinsman of some. This victory over the nobility may thus have ensured the end of major civil wars in France until the French Revolution about a century later.

=== France as the pivot of warfare ===
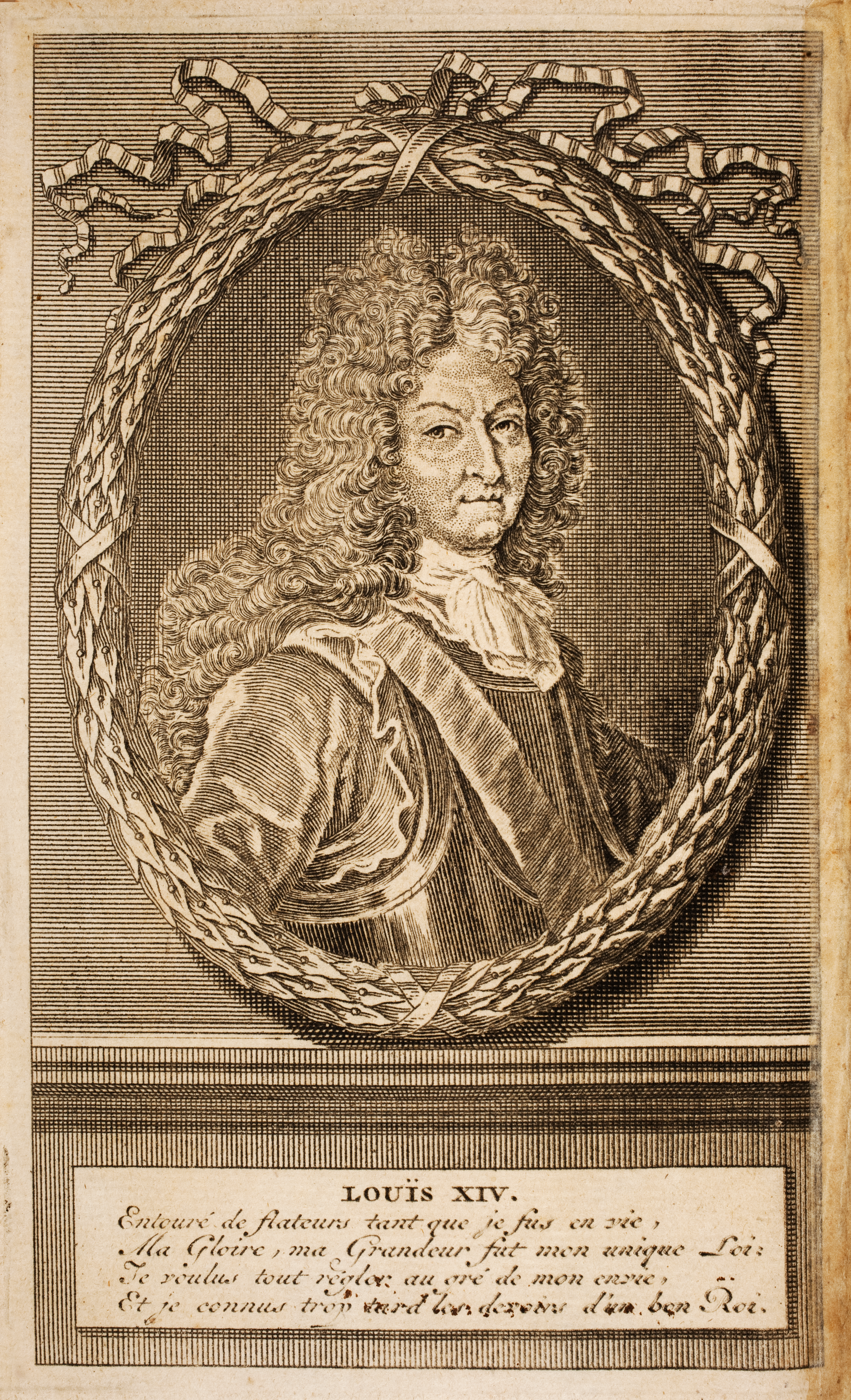
Louis XIV

Under Louis, France was the leading European power, and most wars pivoted around its aggressiveness. No European state exceeded it in population, and no one could match its wealth, central location, and very strong professional army. It had largely avoided the devastation of the Thirty Years' War. Its weaknesses included an inefficient financial system that was hard-pressed to pay for its military adventures, and the tendency of most other powers to gang up against it.

During Louis's reign, France fought three major wars: the Franco-Dutch War, the Nine Years' War, and the War of the Spanish Succession. There were also two lesser conflicts: the War of Devolution and the War of the Reunions.The wars were very expensive but defined Louis XIV's foreign policy, and his personality shaped his approach. Impelled "by a mix of commerce, revenge, and pique", Louis sensed that war was the ideal way to enhance his glory. In peacetime, he concentrated on preparing for the next war. He taught his diplomats that their job was to create tactical and strategic advantages for the French military. By 1695, France retained much of its dominance but had lost control of the seas to England and Holland, and most countries, both Protestant and Catholic, were in alliance against it. Sébastien Le Prestre de Vauban, France's leading military strategist, warned Louis in 1689 that a hostile "Alliance" was too powerful at sea. He recommended that France fight back by licensing French merchant ships to privateer and seize enemy merchant ships while avoiding its navies:

France has its declared enemies Germany and all the states that it embraces; Spain with all its dependencies in Europe, Asia, Africa and America; the Duke of Savoy [in Italy], England, Scotland, Ireland, and all their colonies in the East and West Indies; and Holland with all its possessions in the four corners of the world where it has great establishments. France has ... undeclared enemies, indirectly hostile, hostile, and envious of its greatness, Denmark, Sweden, Poland, Portugal, Venice, Genoa, and part of the Swiss Confederation, all of which states secretly aid France's enemies by the troops that they hire to them, the money they lend them and by protecting and covering their trade.

Vauban was pessimistic about France's so-called friends and allies:

For lukewarm, useless, or impotent friends, France has the Pope, who is indifferent; the King of England [James II] expelled from his country; the Grand Duke of Tuscany; the Dukes of Mantua, Modena, and Parma [all in Italy]; and the other faction of the Swiss. Some of these are sunk in the softness that comes of years of peace, the others are cool in their affections....The English and Dutch are the main pillars of the Alliance; they support it by making war against us in concert with the other powers, and they keep it going by means of the money that they pay every year to... Allies.... We must therefore fall back on privateering as the method of conducting war which is most feasible, simple, cheap, and safe, and which will cost least to the state, the more so since any losses will not be felt by the King, who risks virtually nothing....It will enrich the country, train many good officers for the King, and in a short time force his enemies to sue for peace.

== Edict of Fontainebleau ==
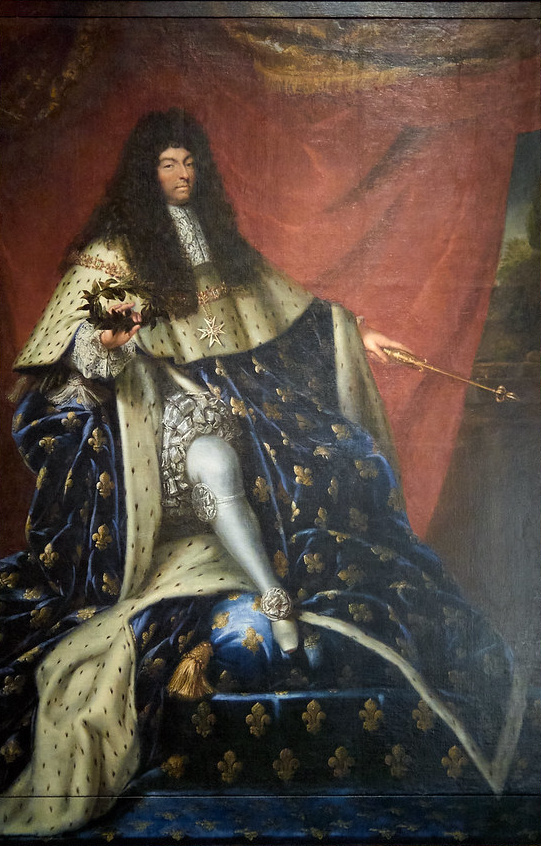
Louis XIV in 1685, the year he revoked the Edict of Nantes

Louis decided to persecute Protestants and revoke the 1598 Edict of Nantes, which awarded Huguenots political and religious freedom. He saw the persistence of Protestantism as a disgraceful reminder of royal powerlessness. After all, the Edict was the pragmatic concession of his grandfather Henry IV to end the longstanding French Wars of Religion. An additional factor in Louis's thinking was the prevailing contemporary European principle to assure socio-political stability, cuius regio, eius religio ("whose realm, his religion"), the idea that the religion of the ruler should be the religion of the realm (as originally confirmed in central Europe in the Peace of Augsburg of 1555).

Responding to petitions, Louis initially excluded Protestants from office, constrained the meeting of synods, closed churches outside of Edict-stipulated areas, banned Protestant outdoor preachers, and prohibited domestic Protestant migration. He also disallowed Protestant-Catholic intermarriages to which third parties objected, encouraged missions to the Protestants, and rewarded converts to Catholicism. This discrimination did not encounter much Protestant resistance, and a steady conversion of Protestants occurred, especially among the noble elites.

In 1681, Louis dramatically increased his persecution of Protestants. The principle of cuius regio, eius religio generally also meant that subjects who refused to convert could emigrate, but Louis banned emigration and effectively insisted that all Protestants must be converted. Secondly, following the proposal of René de Marillac and the Marquis of Louvois, he began quartering dragoons in Protestant homes. While legally sanctioned, the dragonnades subjected Protestants to severe financial ruin and atrocious abuse. Between 300,000 and 400,000 Huguenots converted, as this entailed financial rewards and exemption from the dragonnades.

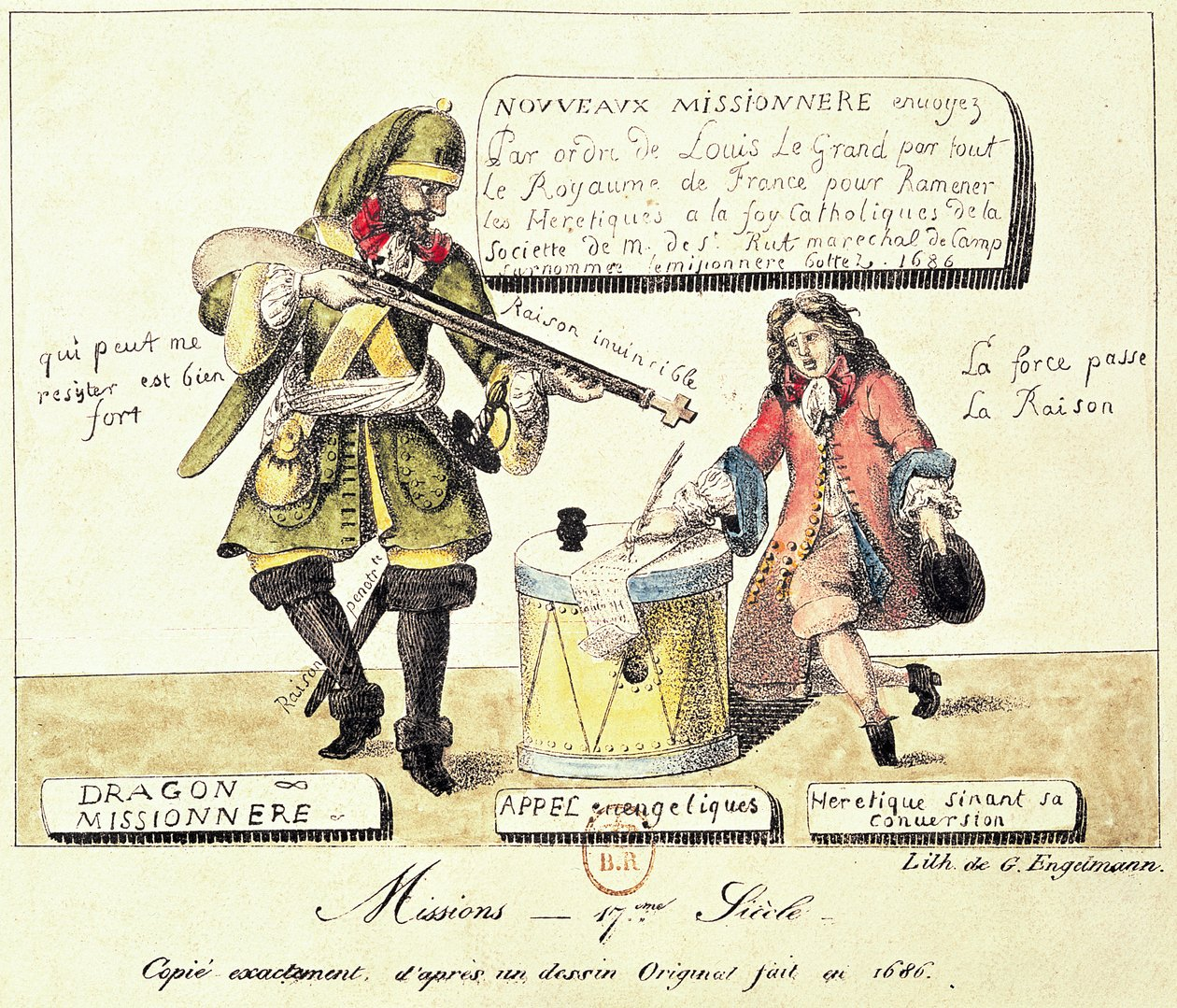
Protestant peasants rebelled against the officially sanctioned dragonnades (conversions enforced by dragoons, labeled "missionaries in boots") that followed the Edict of Fontainebleau.

On 15 October 1685, Louis issued the Edict of Fontainebleau, which cited the redundancy of privileges for Protestants given their scarcity after the extensive conversions. The Edict of Fontainebleau revoked the Edict of Nantes and repealed all the privileges that arose therefrom. By his edict, Louis no longer tolerated the existence of Protestant groups, pastors, or churches in France. No further churches were to be constructed, and those already existing were to be demolished. Pastors could choose either exile or secular life. Those Protestants who had resisted conversion were now to be baptised forcibly into the established church.

Historians have debated Louis's reasons for issuing the Edict of Fontainebleau. He may have been seeking to placate Pope Innocent XI, with whom relations were tense and whose aid was necessary to determine the outcome of a succession crisis in the Electorate of Cologne. He may also have acted to upstage Emperor Leopold I and regain international prestige after the latter defeated the Turks without Louis's help. Otherwise, he may simply have desired to end the remaining divisions in French society dating to the Wars of Religion by fulfilling his coronation oath to eradicate heresy.

Many historians have condemned the Edict of Fontainebleau as gravely harmful to France. In support, they cite the emigration of about 200,000 highly skilled Huguenots (roughly one quarter of the Protestant population, or 1% of the French population) who defied royal decrees and fled France for various Protestant states, weakening the French economy and enriching that of Protestant states. On the other hand, some historians view this as an exaggeration. They argue that most of France's preeminent Protestant businessmen and industrialists converted to Catholicism and remained.

What is certain is that the reaction to the Edict was mixed. Even while French Catholic leaders exulted, Pope Innocent XI still argued with Louis over Gallicanism and criticized the use of violence. Protestants across Europe were horrified at the treatment of their co-religionists, but most Catholics in France applauded the move. Nonetheless, it is indisputable that Louis's public image in most of Europe, especially in Protestant regions, was dealt a severe blow.

In the end, however, despite renewed tensions with the Camisards of south-central France at the end of his reign, Louis may have helped ensure that his successor would experience fewer instances of the religion-based disturbances that had plagued his forebears. French society would sufficiently change by the time of his descendant, Louis XVI, to welcome tolerance in the form of the 1787 Edict of Versailles, also known as the Edict of Tolerance. This restored to non-Catholics their civil rights and the freedom to worship openly. With the advent of the French Revolution in 1789, Protestants were granted equal rights with their Roman Catholic counterparts.

== Nine Years' War ==
=== Causes and conduct of the war ===
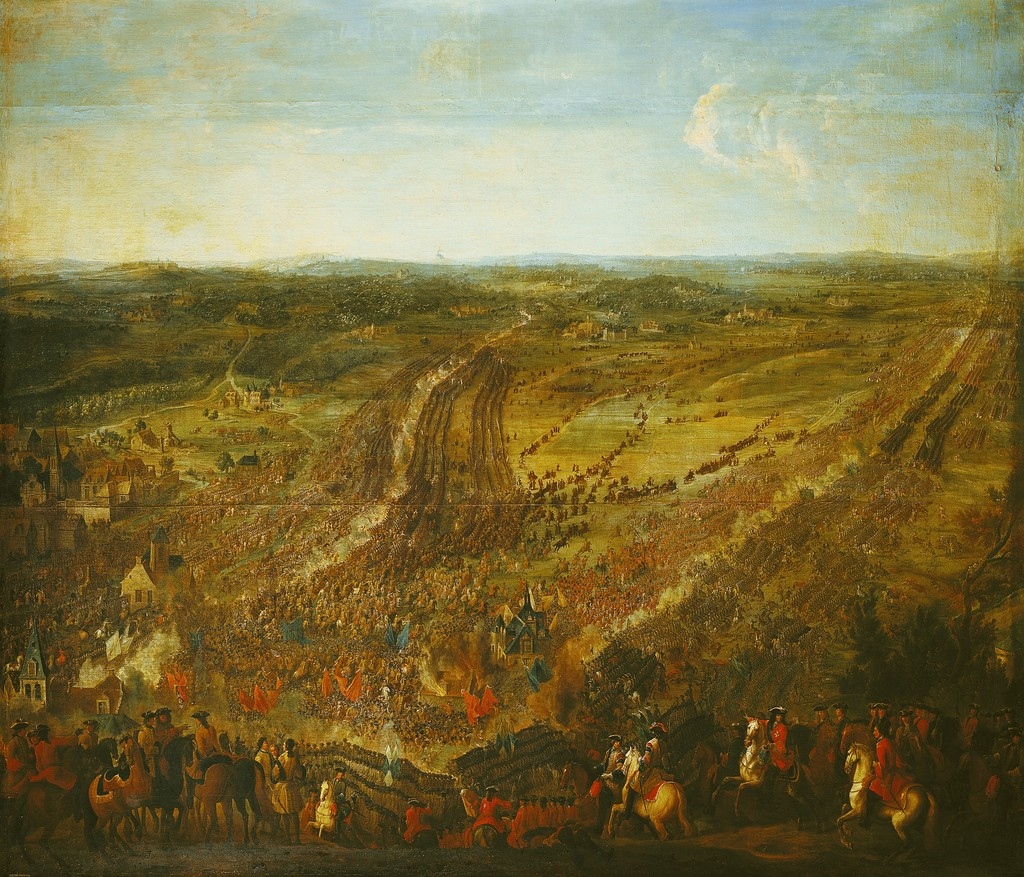
Battle of Fleurus, 1690

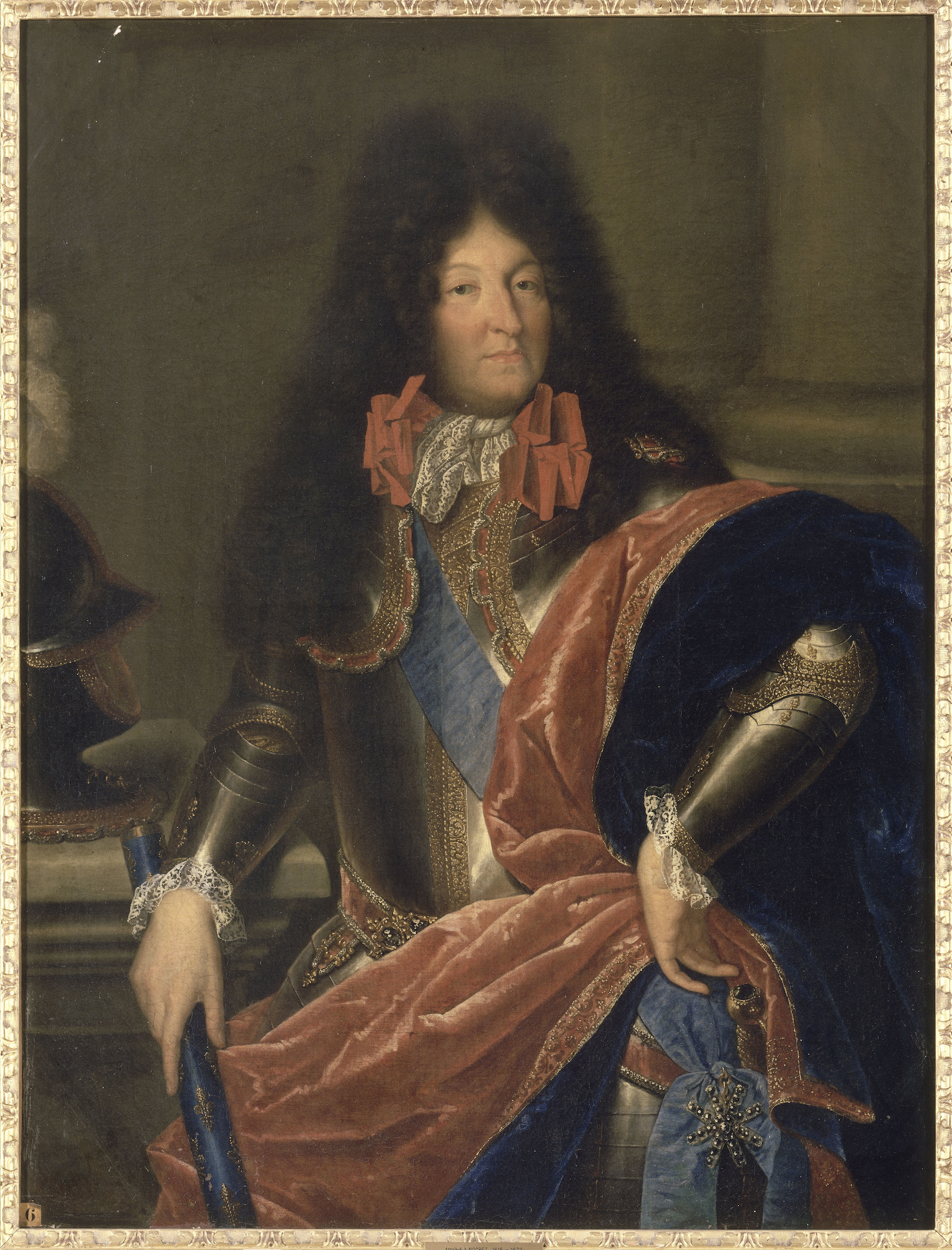
Louis in 1690

The Nine Years' War, which lasted from 1688 to 1697, initiated a period of decline in Louis's political and diplomatic fortunes. It arose from two events in the Rhineland. First, in 1685, the Elector Palatine Charles II died. All that remained of his immediate family was Louis's sister-in-law, Elizabeth Charlotte. German law ostensibly barred her from succeeding to her brother's lands and electoral dignity, but it was unclear enough for arguments in favour of Elizabeth Charlotte to have a chance of success. Conversely, the princess was demonstrably entitled to a division of the family's personal property. Louis pressed her claims to land and chattels, hoping the latter, at least, would be given to her. Then, in 1688, Maximilian Henry of Bavaria, Archbishop of Cologne, an ally of France, died. The archbishopric had traditionally been held by the Wittelsbachs of Bavaria, but the Bavarian claimant to replace Maximilian Henry, Prince Joseph Clemens of Bavaria, was at that time not more than 17 years old and not even ordained. Louis sought instead to install his own candidate, Wilhelm Egon von Fürstenberg, to ensure the key Rhenish state remained an ally.

In light of his foreign and domestic policies during the early 1680s, which were perceived as aggressive, Louis's actions, fostered by the succession crises of the late 1680s, created concern and alarm in much of Europe. This led to the formation of the 1686 League of Augsburg by the Holy Roman Emperor, Spain, Sweden, Saxony, and Bavaria. Their stated intention was to return France to at least the borders agreed to in the Treaty of Nijmegen. Emperor Leopold I's persistent refusal to convert the Truce of Ratisbon into a permanent treaty fed Louis's fears that the Emperor would turn on France and attack the Reunions after settling his affairs in the Balkans.

Another event Louis found threatening was England's Glorious Revolution of 1688. Although King James II was Catholic, his two Anglican daughters, Mary and Anne, ensured the English people a Protestant succession. But when James II's son James Francis Edward Stuart was born, he took precedence in succession over his sisters. This seemed to herald an era of Catholic monarchs in England. Protestant lords called on the Dutch Prince William III of Orange, grandson of Charles I of England, to come to their aid. He sailed for England with troops despite Louis's warning that France would regard it as a provocation. Witnessing numerous desertions and defections, even among those closest to him, James II fled England. Parliament declared the throne vacant, and offered it to James's daughter Mary II and his son-in-law and nephew William. Vehemently anti-French, William (now William III of England) pushed his new kingdoms into war, thus transforming the League of Augsburg into the Grand Alliance. Before this happened, Louis expected William's expedition to England to absorb his energies and those of his allies, so he dispatched troops to the Rhineland after the expiry of his ultimatum to the German princes requiring confirmation of the Truce of Ratisbon and acceptance of his demands about the succession crises. This military manoeuvre was also intended to protect his eastern provinces from Imperial invasion by depriving the enemy army of sustenance, thus explaining the preemptive scorched earth policy pursued in much of southwestern Germany (the "Devastation of the Palatinate").

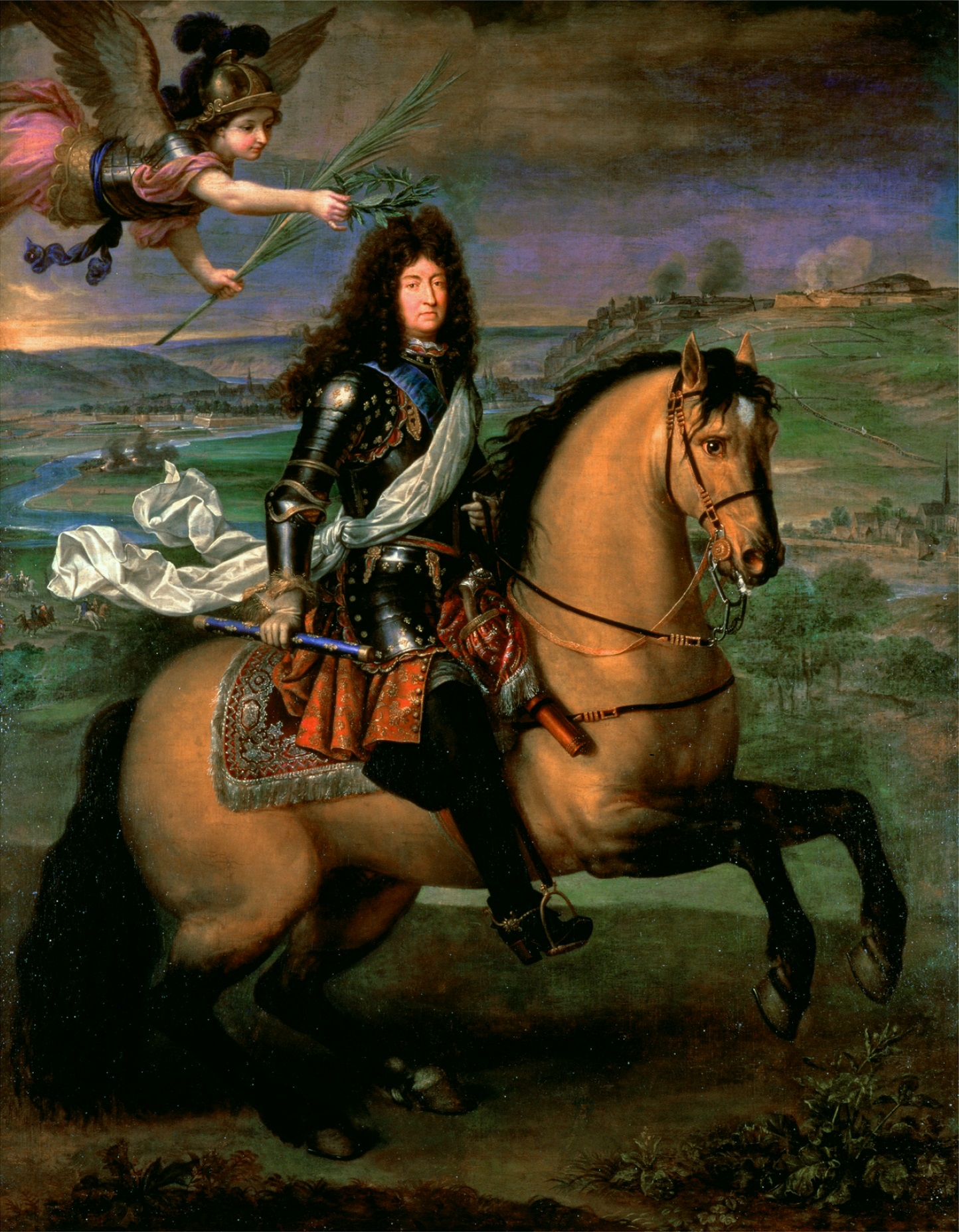
Louis XIV at the siege of Namur (1692)

French armies were generally victorious throughout the war because of Imperial commitments in the Balkans, French logistical superiority, and the quality of French generals such as Condé's famous pupil, François Henri de Montmorency-Bouteville, duc de Luxembourg. He triumphed at the Battles of Fleurus in 1690, Steenkerque in 1692, and Landen in 1693, although, the battles proved to be of little of strategic consequence, mostly due to the nature of late 17th-century warfare.

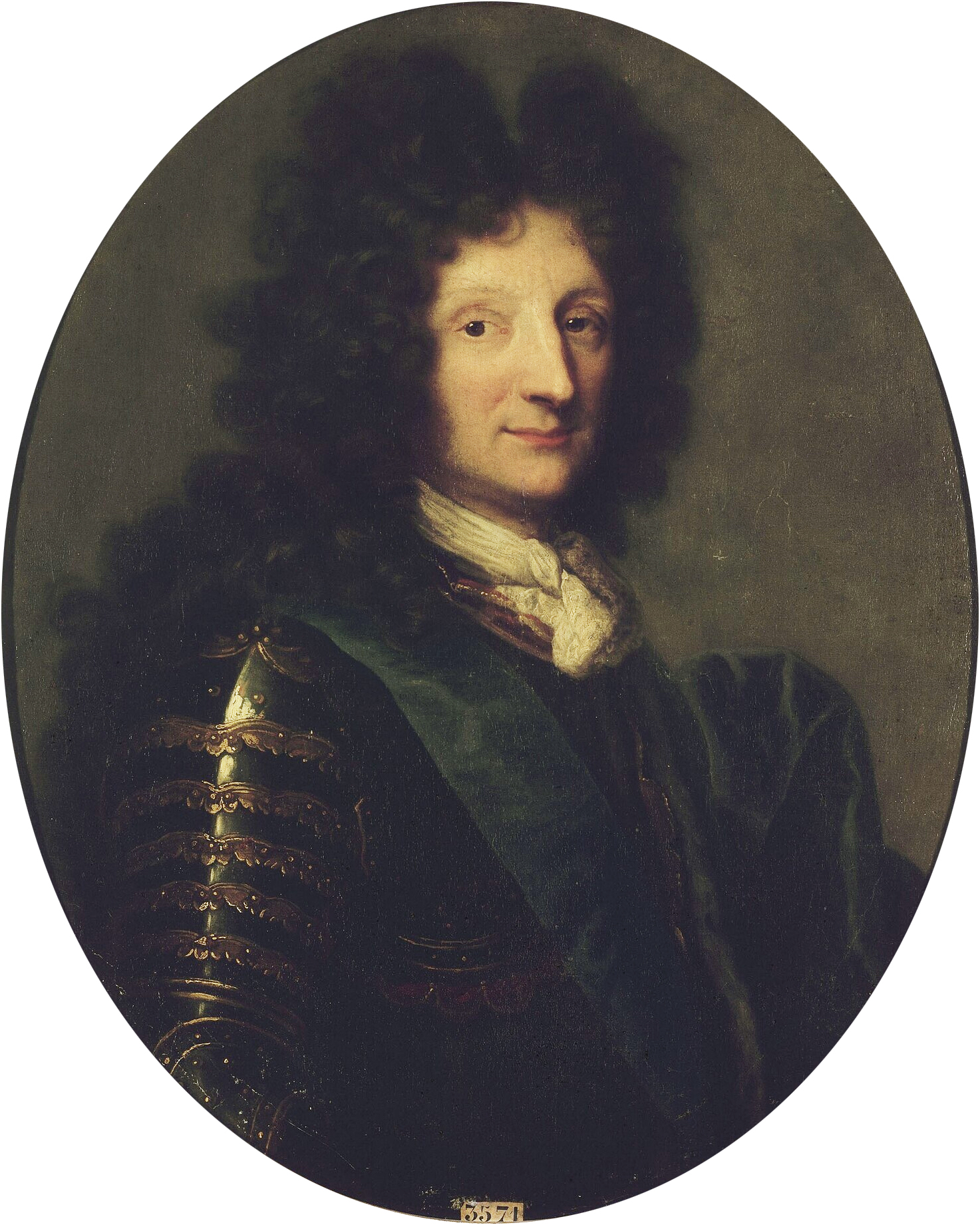
Marshal de Luxembourg

Although an attempt to restore James II failed at the Battle of the Boyne in 1690, France accumulated a string of victories from Flanders in the north, Germany in the east, and Italy and Spain in the south, to the high seas and the colonies. Louis personally supervised the captures of Mons in 1691 and Namur in 1692. Luxembourg gave France the defensive line of the Sambre by capturing Charleroi in 1693. France also overran most of the Duchy of Savoy after the battles of Marsaglia and Staffarde in 1693. While naval stalemate ensued after the French victory at the Battle of Beachy Head in 1690 and the Allied victory at Barfleur-La Hougue in 1692, the Battle of Torroella in 1694 exposed Catalonia to French invasion, culminating in the capture of Barcelona. The Dutch captured Pondichéry in 1693, but a 1697 French raid on the Spanish treasure port of Cartagena, Spain, yielded a fortune of 10,000,000 livres.

In July 1695, the city of Namur, occupied for three years by the French, was besieged by an allied army led by William III. Louis XIV ordered the surprise destruction of a Flemish city to divert the attention of these troops. This led to the bombardment of Brussels, in which more than 4,000 buildings were destroyed, including the entire city centre. The strategy failed, as Namur fell three weeks later, but harmed Louis XIV's reputation: a century later, Napoleon deemed the bombardment "as barbarous as it was useless".

Peace was broached by Sweden in 1690. By 1692, both sides evidently wanted peace, and secret bilateral talks began, but to no avail. Louis tried to break up the alliance against him by dealing with individual opponents but did not achieve his aim until 1696 when the Savoyards agreed to the Treaty of Turin and switched sides. Thereafter, members of the League of Augsburg rushed to the peace table, and negotiations for a general peace began in earnest, culminating in the Peace of Ryswick of 1697.

=== Peace of Ryswick ===
The Peace of Ryswick ended the War of the League of Augsburg and disbanded the Grand Alliance. By manipulating their rivalries and suspicions, Louis divided his enemies and broke their power.

The treaty yielded many benefits for France. Louis secured permanent French sovereignty over all of Alsace, including Strasbourg, and established the Rhine as the Franco-German border (as it is to this day). Pondichéry and Acadia were returned to France, and Louis's de facto possession of Saint-Domingue was recognised as lawful. However, he returned Catalonia and most of the Reunions.

French military superiority might have allowed him to press for more advantageous terms. Thus, his generosity to Spain with regard to Catalonia has been read as a concession to foster pro-French sentiment and may ultimately have induced King Charles II to name Louis's grandson Philip, Duke of Anjou, heir to the Spanish throne. In exchange for financial compensation, France renounced its interests in the Electorate of Cologne and the Palatinate. Lorraine, which had been occupied by the French since 1670, was returned to its rightful Duke Leopold, albeit with a right of way to the French military. William and Mary were recognised as joint sovereigns of the British Isles, and Louis withdrew support for James II. The Dutch were given the right to garrison forts in the Spanish Netherlands that acted as a protective barrier against possible French aggression. Though in some respects the Treaty of Ryswick may appear a diplomatic defeat for Louis since he failed to place client rulers in control of the Palatinate or the Electorate of Cologne, he did fulfil many of the aims laid down in his 1688 ultimatum. In any case, peace in 1697 was desirable to Louis, since France was exhausted from the costs of the war.

== War of the Spanish Succession ==
=== Causes and build-up to the war ===
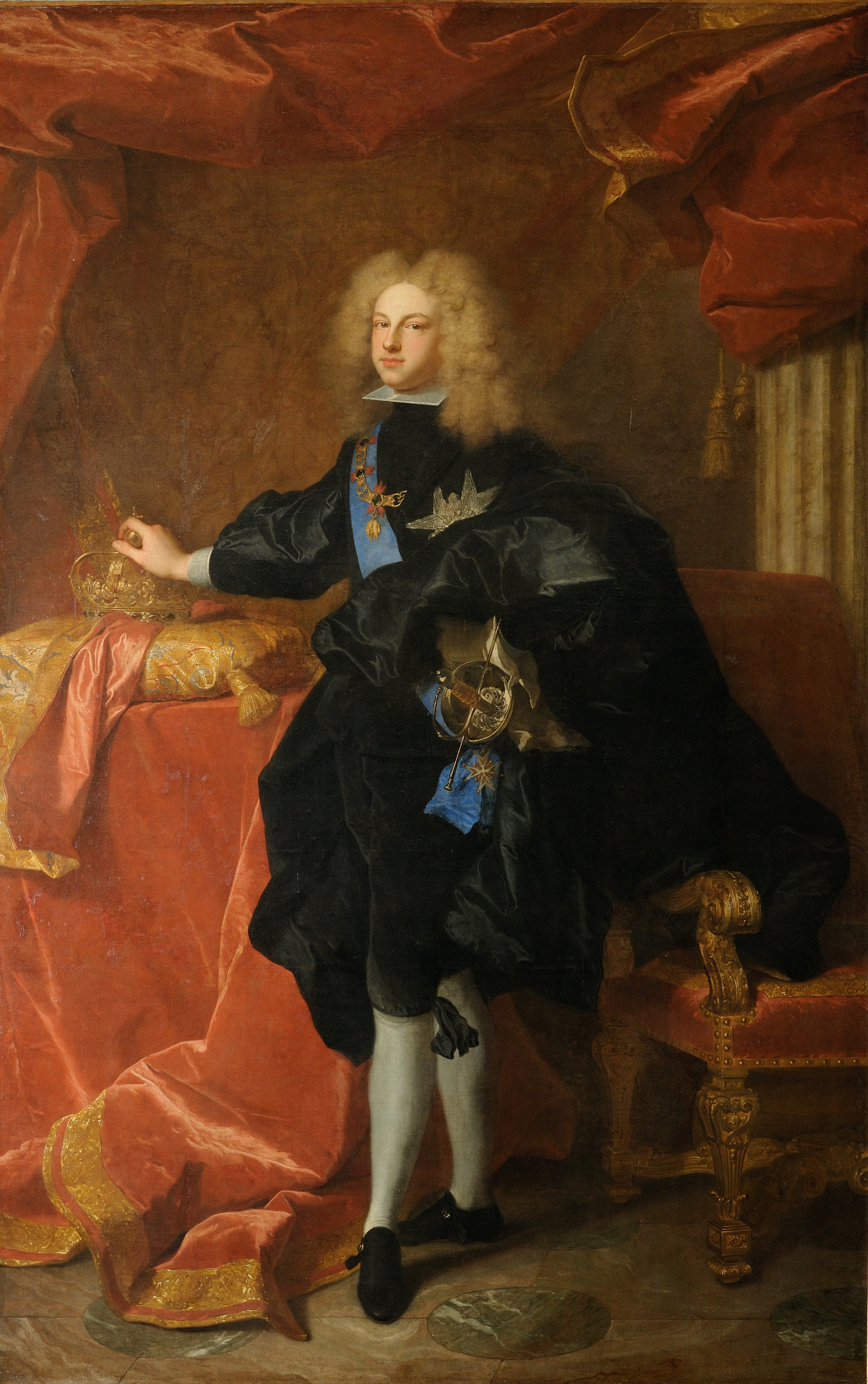
Philip V of Spain

By the time of the Peace of Ryswick, the Spanish succession had been a source of concern to European leaders for well over forty years. King Charles II ruled a vast empire comprising Spain, Naples, Sicily, Milan, the Spanish Netherlands, and numerous Spanish colonies. He produced no children, however, and consequently had no direct heirs.

The principal claimants to the throne of Spain belonged to the ruling families of France and Austria. The French claim derived from Louis XIV's mother Anne of Austria (the older sister of Philip IV of Spain) and his wife Maria Theresa (Philip IV's eldest daughter). Based on the laws of primogeniture, France had the better claim as it originated from the eldest daughters in two generations. However, their renunciation of succession rights complicated matters. In the case of Maria Theresa, nonetheless, the renunciation was considered null and void owing to Spain's breach of her marriage contract with Louis. In contrast, no renunciations tainted the claims of Emperor Leopold I's son Charles, Archduke of Austria, who was a grandson of Philip III's youngest daughter Maria Anna. The English and Dutch feared that a French or Austrian-born Spanish king would threaten the balance of power and thus preferred the Bavarian Prince Joseph Ferdinand, a grandson of Leopold I through his first wife Margaret Theresa of Spain (the younger daughter of Philip IV).

In an attempt to avoid war, Louis signed the Treaty of the Hague with William III of England in 1698. This agreement divided Spain's Italian territories between Louis's son le Grand Dauphin and Archduke Charles, with the rest of the empire awarded to Joseph Ferdinand. William III consented to permitting the Dauphin's new territories to become part of France when the latter succeeded to his father's throne. The signatories, however, omitted to consult the ruler of these lands, and Charles II was passionately opposed to the dismemberment of his empire. In 1699, he re-confirmed his 1693 will that named Joseph Ferdinand as his sole successor.

Six months later, Joseph Ferdinand died. Therefore, in 1700, Louis and William III concluded a fresh partitioning agreement, the Treaty of London. This allocated Spain, the Low Countries, and the Spanish colonies to the Archduke. The Dauphin would receive all of Spain's Italian territories. Charles II acknowledged that his empire could only remain undivided by bequeathing it entirely to a Frenchman or an Austrian. Under pressure from his German wife, Maria Anna of Neuburg, Charles II named Archduke Charles as his sole heir.

=== Acceptance of the will of Charles II and consequences ===
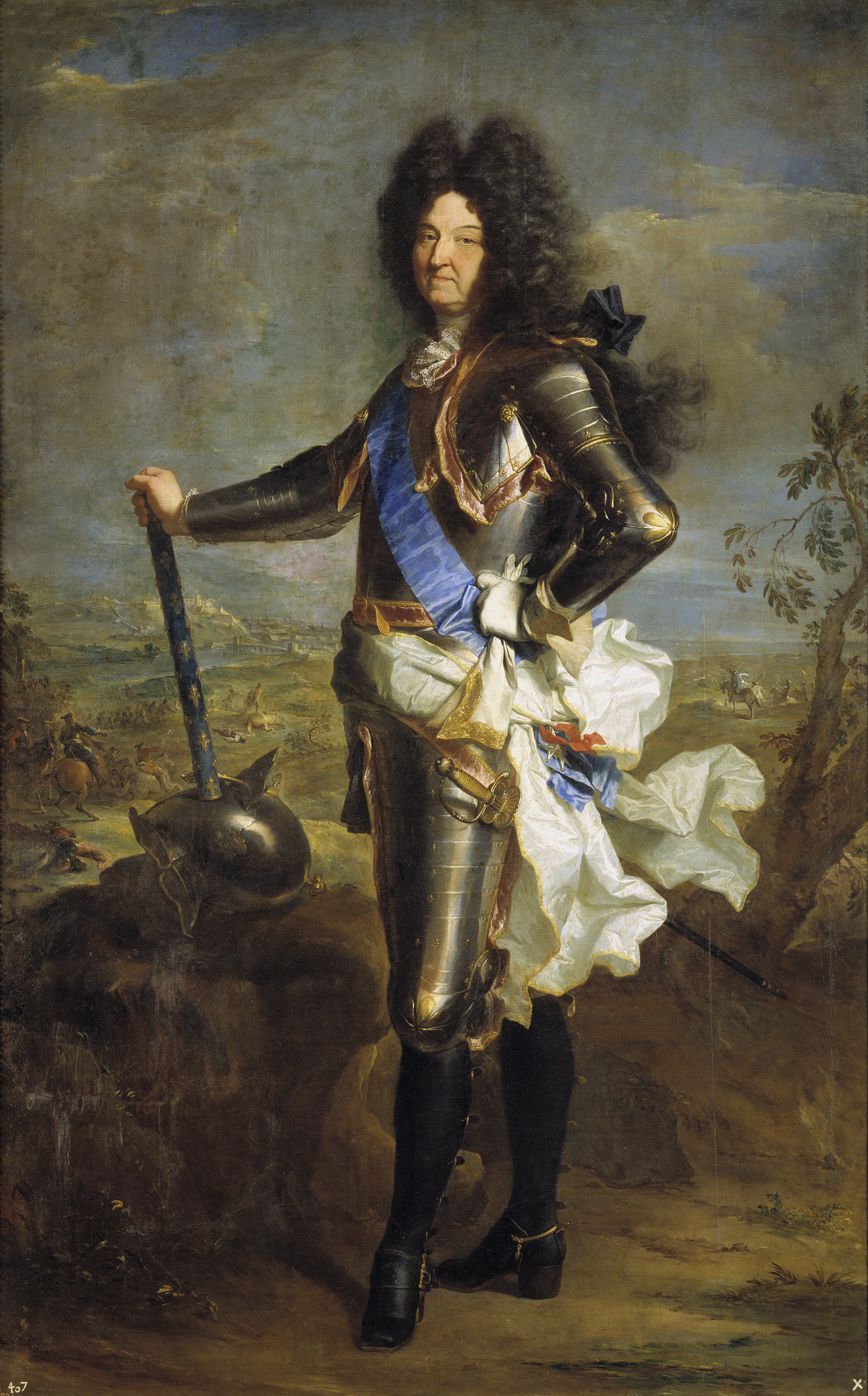
Louis in 1701

On his deathbed in 1700, Charles II of Spain unexpectedly changed his will. The clear demonstration of French military superiority for many decades before this time, the pro-French faction at the court of Spain, and even Pope Innocent XII convinced him that France was more likely to preserve his empire intact. He thus offered the entire empire to the Dauphin's second son Philip, Duke of Anjou, provided it remained undivided. Anjou was not in the direct line of French succession, thus his accession would not cause a Franco-Spanish union. If Anjou refused, the throne would be offered to his younger brother Charles, Duke of Berry. If the Duke of Berry declined it, it would go to Archduke Charles, then to the distantly related House of Savoy if Charles declined it.

Louis was confronted with a difficult choice. He could agree to a partition of the Spanish possessions and avoid a general war, or accept Charles II's will and alienate much of Europe. He may initially have been inclined to abide by the partition treaties, but the Dauphin's insistence persuaded him otherwise. Moreover, Louis's foreign minister, Jean-Baptiste Colbert, marquis de Torcy, pointed out that war with the Emperor would almost certainly ensue whether Louis accepted the partition treaties or Charles II's will. He emphasised that, should it come to war, William III was unlikely to stand by France since he "made a treaty to avoid war and did not intend to go to war to implement the treaty". Indeed, in the event of war, it might be preferable to be already in control of the disputed lands. Eventually, therefore, Louis decided to accept Charles II's will. Philip, Duke of Anjou, thus became Philip V, King of Spain.

Most European rulers accepted Philip as king, some reluctantly. Depending on one's views of the war's inevitability, Louis acted reasonably or arrogantly. He confirmed that Philip V retained his French rights despite his new Spanish position. Admittedly, he may only have been hypothesising a theoretical eventuality and not attempting a Franco-Spanish union. But his actions were certainly not read as disinterested. Moreover, Louis sent troops to the Spanish Netherlands to evict Dutch garrisons and secure Dutch recognition of Philip V. In 1701, Philip transferred the asiento (the right to supply slaves to Spanish colonies) to France, as a sign of the two nations' growing connections. As tensions mounted, Louis decided to acknowledge James Stuart, the son of James II, as King of England, Scotland and Ireland on the latter's death, infuriating William III. These actions enraged Britain and the Dutch Republic. With the Holy Roman Emperor and the petty German states, they formed another Grand Alliance and declared war on France in 1702. French diplomacy secured Bavaria, Portugal, and Savoy as Franco-Spanish allies.

=== Commencement of fighting ===
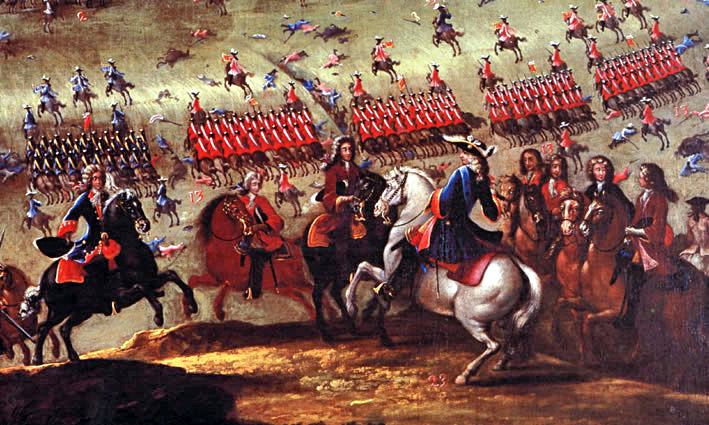
The Franco-Spanish army led by the Duke of Berwick defeated decisively the Alliance forces of Portugal, England, and the Dutch Republic at the Battle of Almansa.

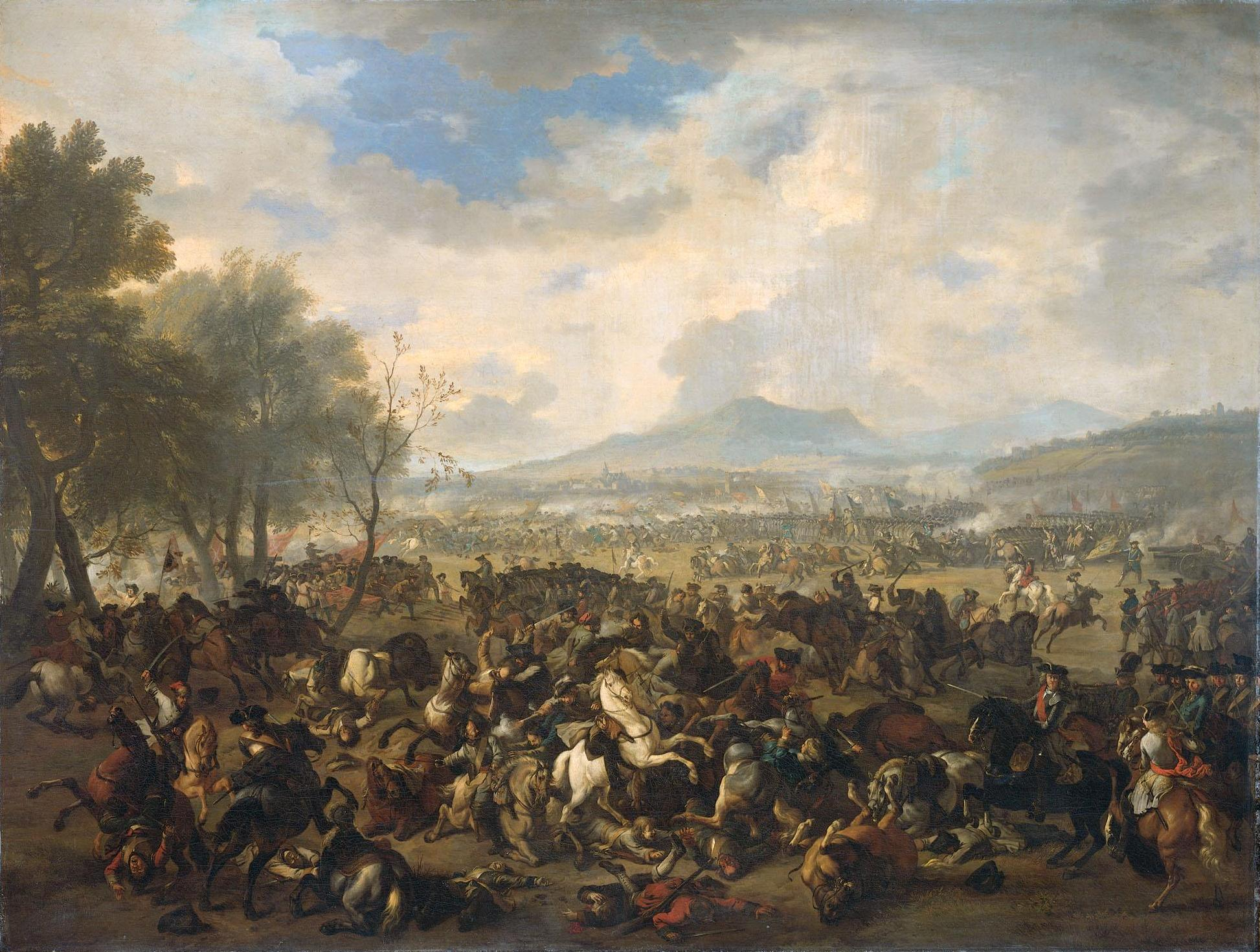
The Battle of Ramillies where the French fought the Dutch and British, 23 May 1706

Even before war was officially declared, hostilities began with Imperial aggression in Italy. Once finally declared, the War of the Spanish Succession lasted almost until Louis's death, at great cost to him and France.

The war began with French successes, but the talents of John Churchill, 1st Duke of Marlborough, and Eugene of Savoy checked these victories and broke the myth of French invincibility. The duo allowed the Palatinate and Austria to occupy Bavaria after their victory at the Battle of Blenheim. Maximilian II Emanuel, Elector of Bavaria, had to flee to the Spanish Netherlands. The impact of this victory won the support of Portugal and Savoy. Later, the Battle of Ramillies delivered the Low Countries to the Allies, and the Battle of Turin forced Louis to evacuate Italy, leaving it open to Allied forces. Marlborough and Eugene met again at the Battle of Oudenarde, which enabled them to invade France.

France established contact with Francis II Rákóczi and promised support if he took up the cause of Hungarian independence.

Defeats, famine, and mounting debt greatly weakened France. Between 1693 and 1710, over two million people died in two famines, made worse as foraging armies seized food supplies from the villages. In desperation, Louis ordered a disastrous invasion of the English island of Guernsey in the autumn of 1704 with the aim of raiding their successful harvest. By the winter of 1708–09, he was willing to accept peace at nearly any cost. He agreed that the entire Spanish empire should be surrendered to Archduke Charles, and also consented to return to the frontiers of the Peace of Westphalia, giving up all the territories he had acquired over 60 years. But he could not promise that Philip V would accept these terms, so the Allies demanded that Louis single-handedly attack his grandson to force these terms on him. If he could not achieve this within the year, the war would resume. Louis would not accept these terms.

=== Turning point ===
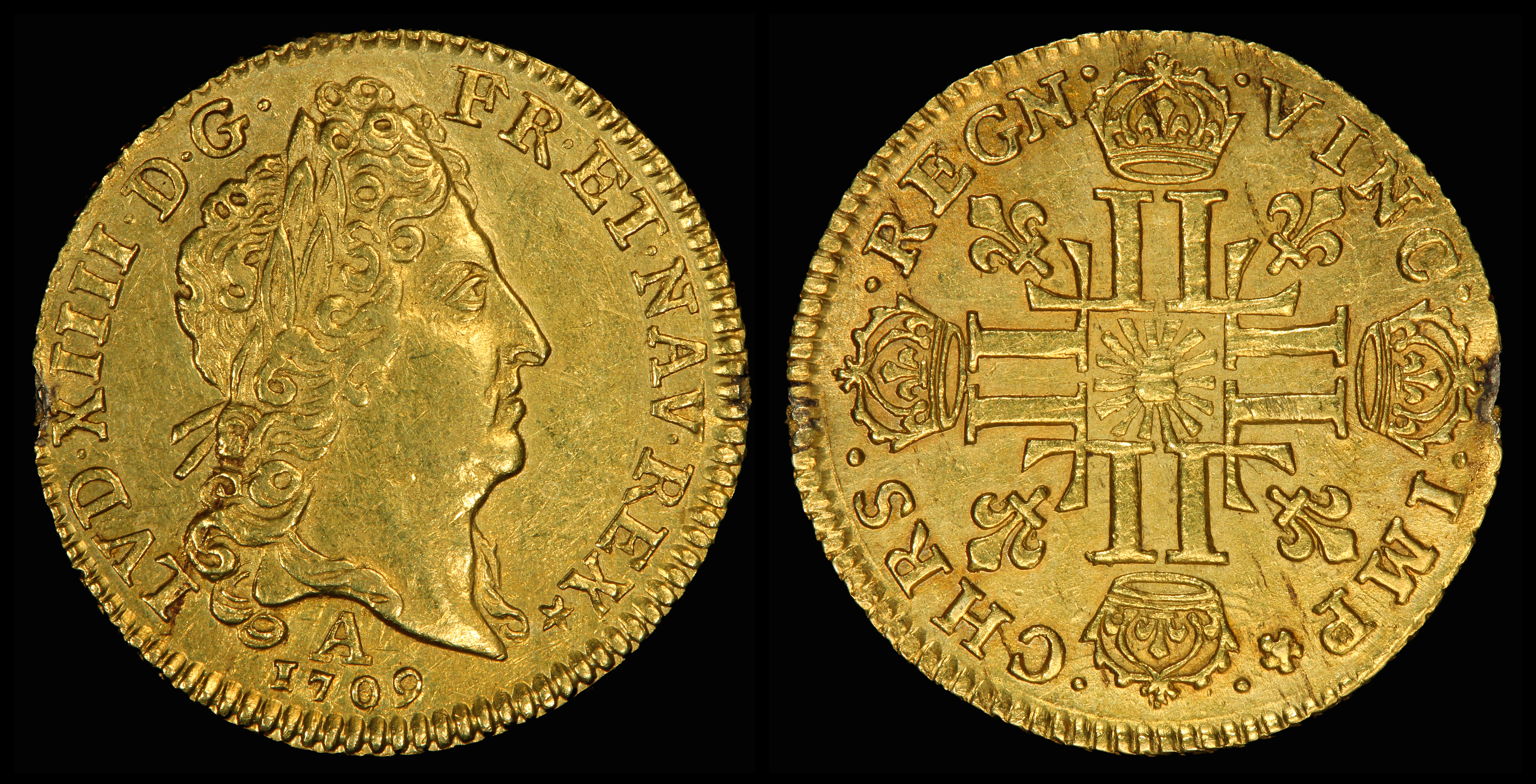
Louis XIV depicted on a Louis d'or in 1709

The final phases of the War of the Spanish Succession demonstrated that the Allies could not maintain Archduke Charles in Spain just as surely as France could not retain the entire Spanish inheritance for Philip V. The Allies were definitively expelled from central Spain by the Franco-Spanish victories at the Battles of Villaviciosa and Brihuega in 1710. French forces elsewhere remained obdurate despite their defeats. The Allies suffered a Pyrrhic victory at the Battle of Malplaquet with 21,000 casualties, twice that of the French. Eventually, France recovered its military pride with the decisive victory at Denain in 1712.

French military successes near the end of the war took place against the background of a changed political situation in Austria. In 1705, Emperor Leopold I died. His elder son and successor, Joseph I, followed him in 1711. His heir was none other than Archduke Charles, who secured control of all of his brother's Austrian landholdings. If the Spanish empire then fell to him, it would have resurrected a domain as vast as Holy Roman Emperor Charles V's in the 16th century. To the maritime powers of Great Britain and the Dutch Republic, this would have been as undesirable as a Franco-Spanish union.

=== Conclusion of peace ===
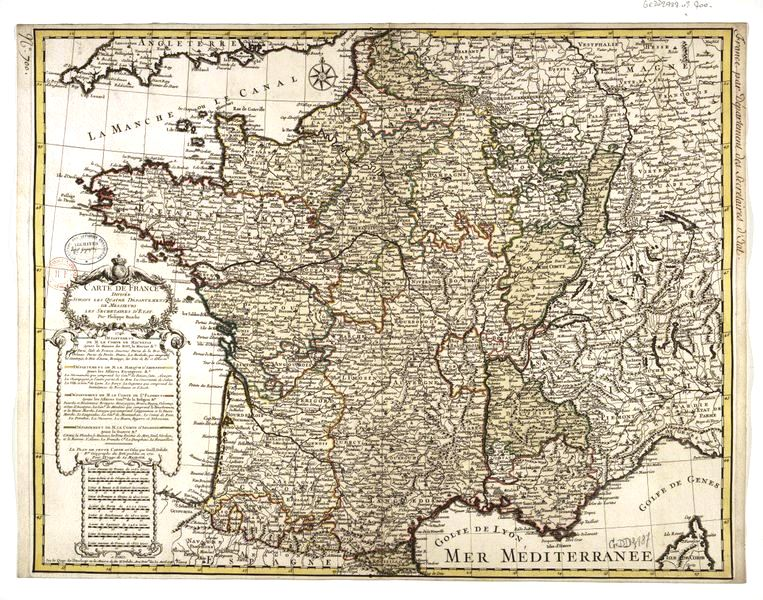
Map of France after the death of Louis XIV

As a result of the fresh British perspective on the European balance of power, Anglo-French talks began, culminating in the 1713 Peace of Utrecht between Louis, Philip V of Spain, Anne of Great Britain, and the Dutch Republic. In 1714, after losing Landau and Freiburg, the Holy Roman Emperor also made peace with France in the Treaties of Rastatt and Baden.

In the general settlement, Philip V retained Spain and its colonies, while Austria received the Spanish Netherlands and divided Spanish Italy with Savoy. Britain kept Gibraltar and Menorca. Louis agreed to withdraw his support for James Stuart, son of James II and pretender to the thrones of Great Britain and Ireland, and ceded Newfoundland, Rupert's Land, and Acadia in the Americas to Anne. Britain gained the most from the treaty, but the final terms were much more favourable to France than those being discussed in peace negotiations in 1709 and 1710. France retained Île-Saint-Jean and Île Royale, and Louis acquired a few minor European territories, such as the Principality of Orange and the Ubaye Valley, which covered transalpine passes into Italy. Thanks to Louis, his allies the Electors of Bavaria and Cologne were restored to their prewar status and returned their lands.

== Personal life ==
=== Marriages and children ===
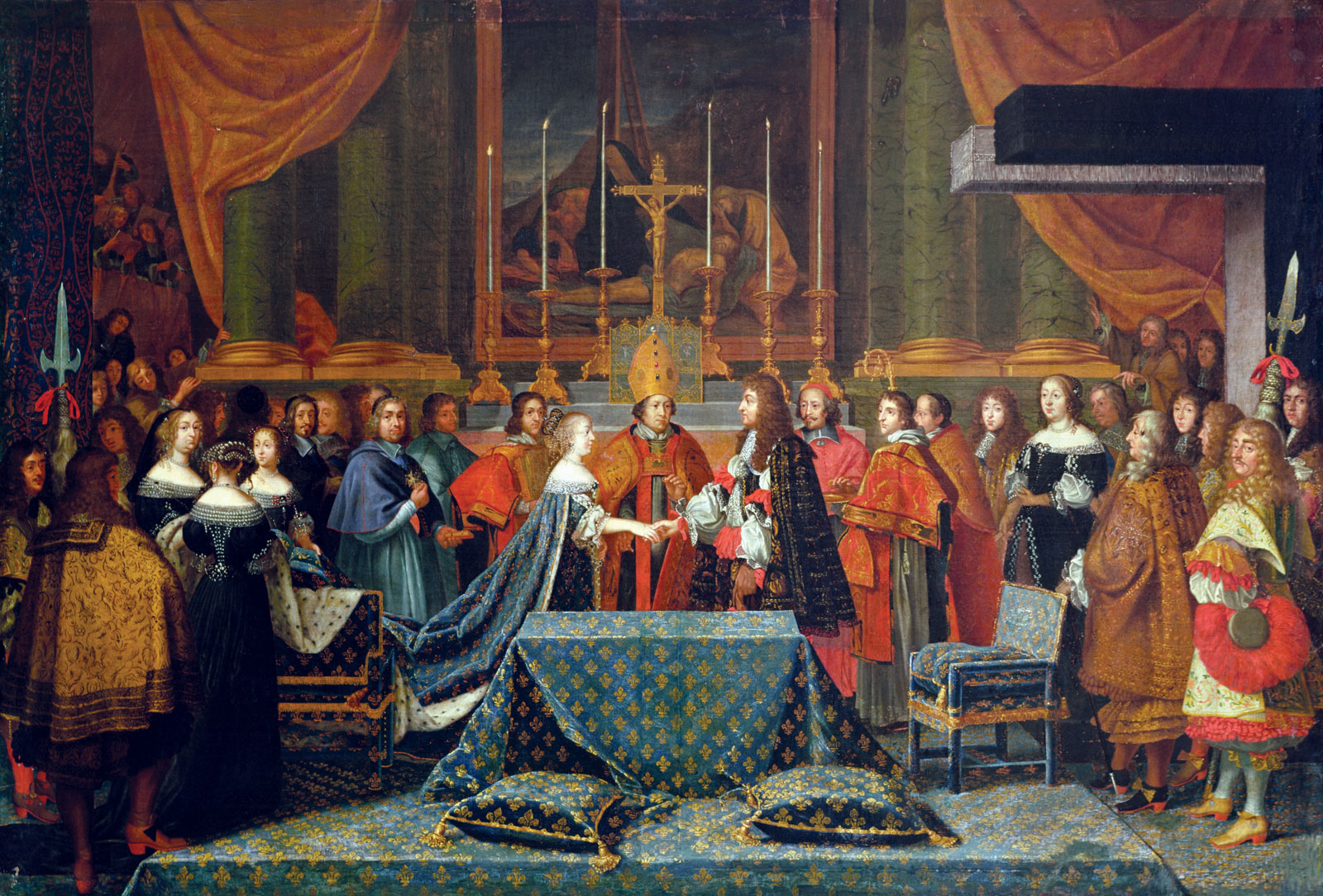
Wedding of Louis and Maria Theresa

Dual Cypher of King Louis XIV & Queen Marie Thérèse

Louis and his wife Maria Theresa of Spain had six children from the marriage contracted for them in 1660. However, only one child, the eldest, survived to adulthood: Louis le Grand Dauphin, known as Monseigneur. Maria Theresa died in 1683, whereupon Louis remarked that she had never caused him unease on any other occasion.

Despite evidence of affection early on in their marriage, Louis was never faithful to Maria Theresa. He took a series of mistresses, both official and unofficial. Among the better documented are Louise de La Vallière (with whom he had five children; 1661–1667), Bonne de Pons d'Heudicourt (1665), Catherine Charlotte de Gramont (1665), Françoise-Athénaïs, Marquise de Montespan (with whom he had seven children; 1667–1680), Anne de Rohan-Chabot (1669–1675), Claude de Vin des Œillets (one child born in 1676), Isabelle de Ludres (1675–1678), and Marie Angélique de Scorailles (1679–1681), who died at age 19 in childbirth. Through these liaisons, he produced numerous illegitimate children, most of whom he married to members of cadet branches of the royal family.

Louis proved relatively more faithful to his second wife, Françoise d'Aubigné, Marquise de Maintenon. He first met her through her work caring for his children by Madame de Montespan, noting the care she gave to his favourite, Louis Auguste, Duke of Maine. The king was, at first, put off by her strict religious practice, but he warmed to her through her care for his children.

When he legitimized his children by Madame de Montespan on 20 December 1673, Françoise d'Aubigné became the royal governess at Saint-Germain. As governess, she was one of very few people permitted to speak to him as an equal, without limits. It is believed that they were married secretly at Versailles on or around 10 October 1683 or January 1684. This marriage, though never announced or publicly discussed, was an open secret and lasted until his death.

=== Piety and religion ===
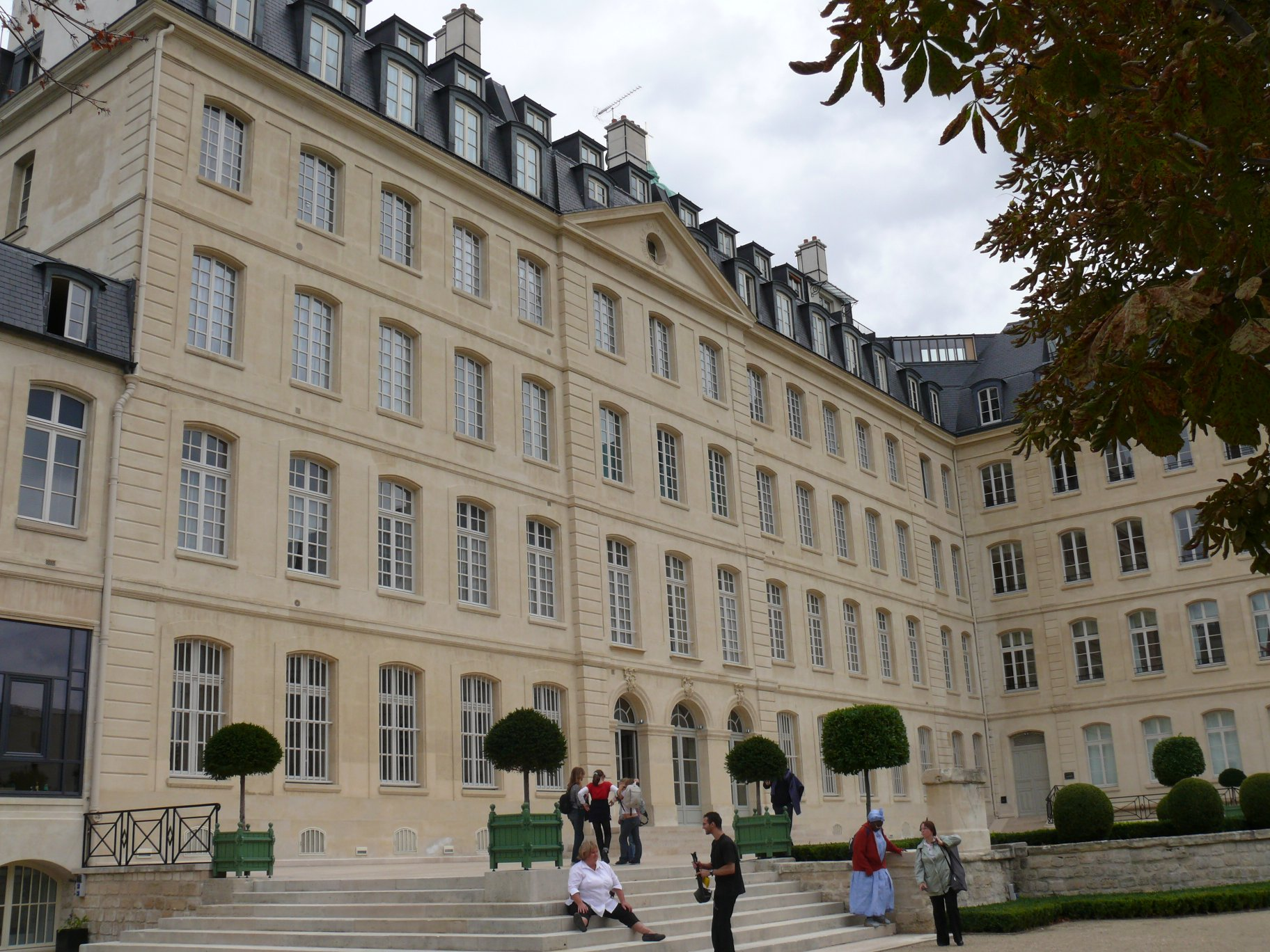
Louis XIV encouraged Catholic missions through the creation of the Paris Foreign Missions Society

Louis was a pious and devout king who saw himself as the head and protector of the Catholic Church in France. He made his devotions daily regardless of where he was, following the liturgical calendar regularly. Under the influence of his very religious second wife, he became much stronger in the practice of his Catholic faith. This included banning opera and comedy performances during Lent.

Towards the middle and the end of his reign, the centre for the King's religious observances was usually the Chapelle Royale at Versailles. Ostentation was a distinguishing feature of his daily Mass, annual celebrations (such as those of Holy Week), and special ceremonies. Louis established the Paris Foreign Missions Society, but his informal alliance with the Ottoman Empire was criticised for undermining Christendom.

=== Patronage of the arts ===
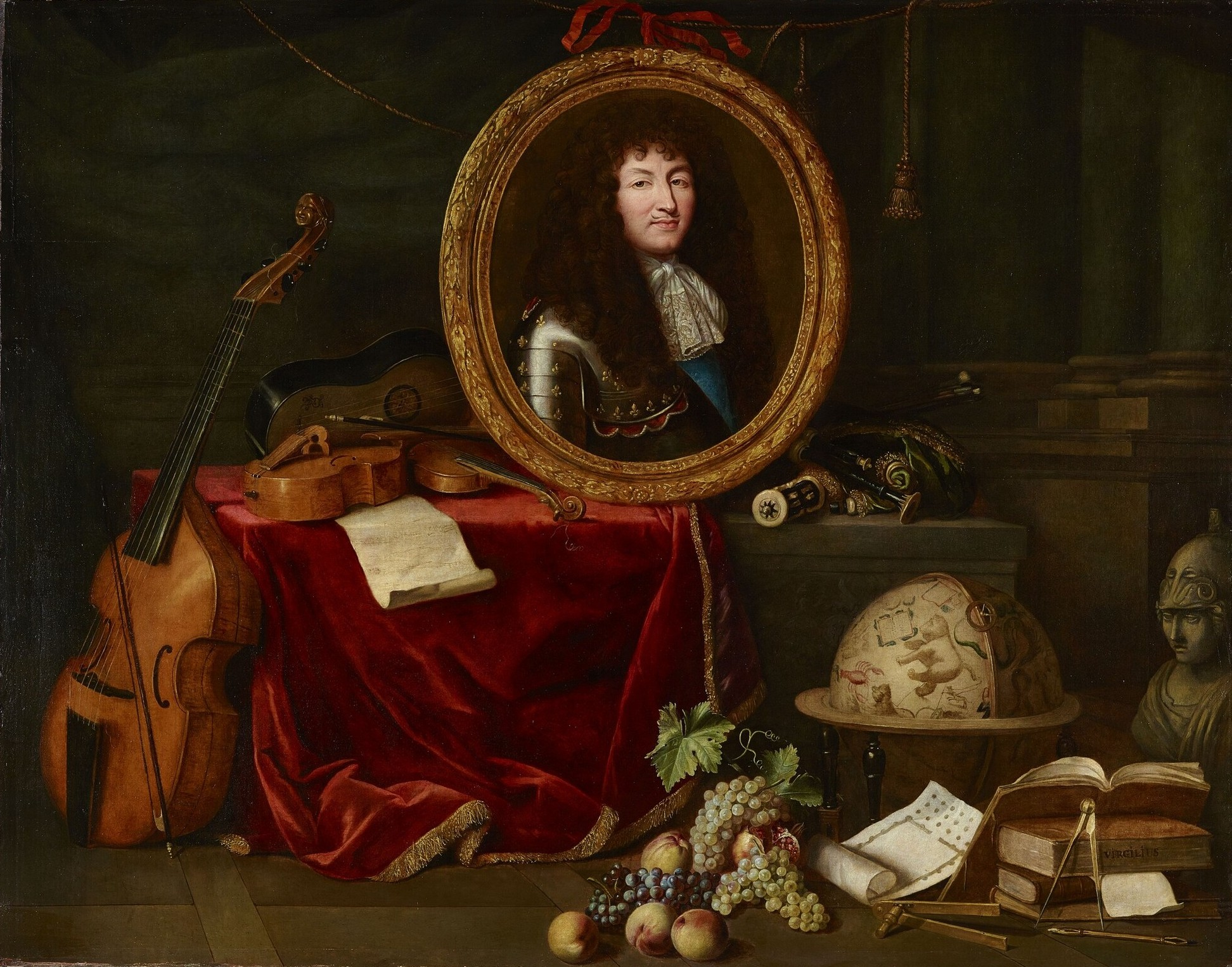
Painting from 1667 depicting Louis as patron of the fine arts

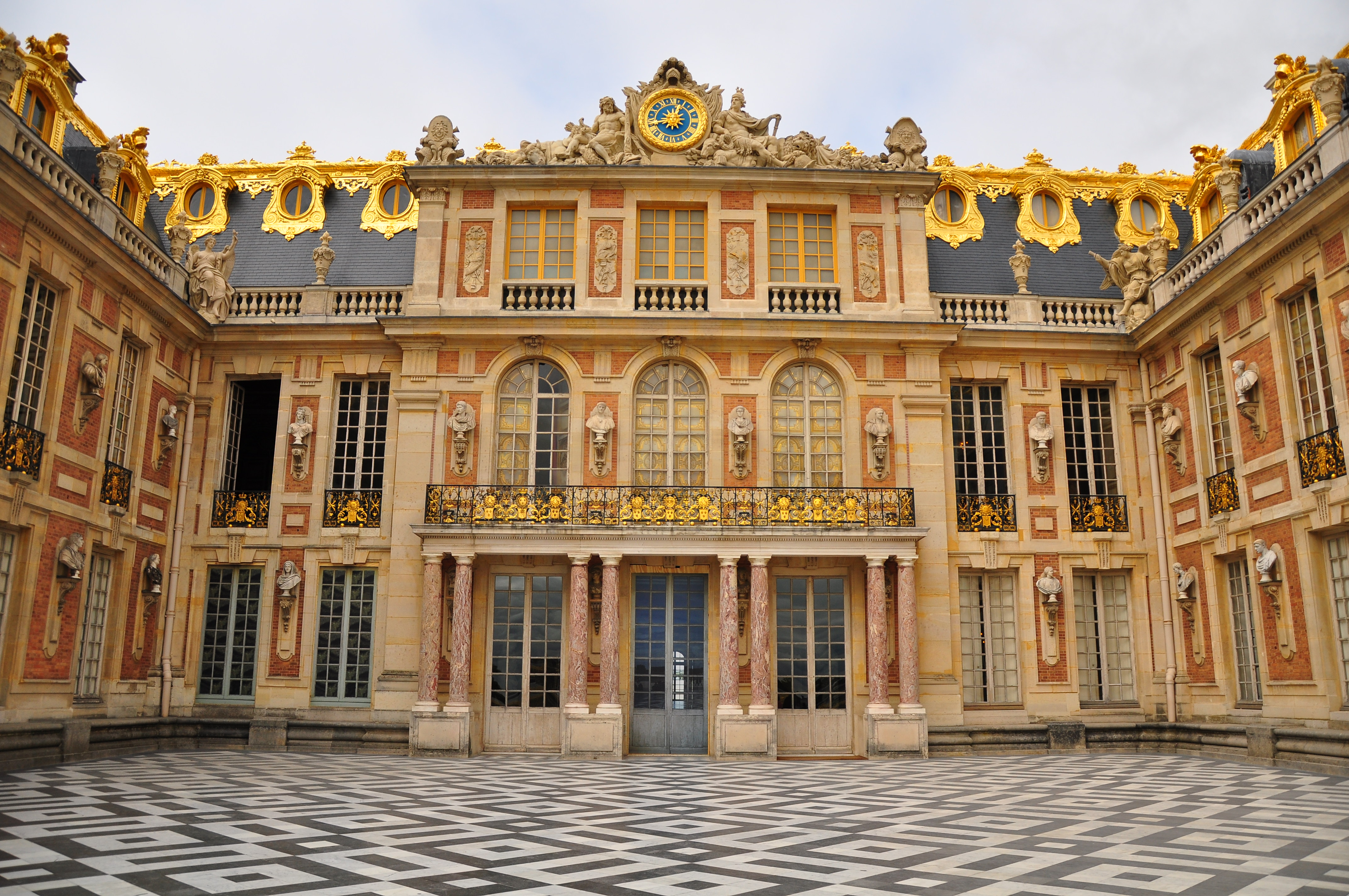
The Cour royale and the Cour de marbre at Versailles

Louis supported the royal court of France and those who worked under him. He brought the Académie Française under his patronage and became its "Protector". He promoted classical French literature by protecting such writers as Molière, Racine, and La Fontaine. Louis also patronised the visual arts by funding and commissioning artists such as Charles Le Brun, Pierre Mignard, Antoine Coysevox, and Hyacinthe Rigaud. Composers and musicians such as Jean-Baptiste Lully, Jacques Champion de Chambonnières, and François Couperin thrived. In 1661, Louis founded the Académie Royale de Danse, and in 1669, the Académie d'Opéra, important events in the evolution of ballet. He also attracted, supported and patronized such artists as André Charles Boulle, who revolutionised marquetry with his art of inlay, today known as "Boulle work". Always on the lookout for new talent, the king launched music competitions: in 1683, Michel-Richard de Lalande thus became deputy master of the Royal Chapel, composing his Symphonies for the Soupers du Roy along with 77 large scale Grand Motets.

Over the course of four building campaigns, Louis converted a hunting lodge commissioned by Louis XIII into the spectacular Palace of Versailles. Except for the current Royal Chapel (built near the end of his reign), the palace achieved much of its current appearance after the third building campaign, which was followed by an official move of the royal court to Versailles on 6 May 1682. Versailles became a dazzling, awe-inspiring setting for state affairs and the reception of foreign dignitaries. At Versailles, the king alone commanded attention.

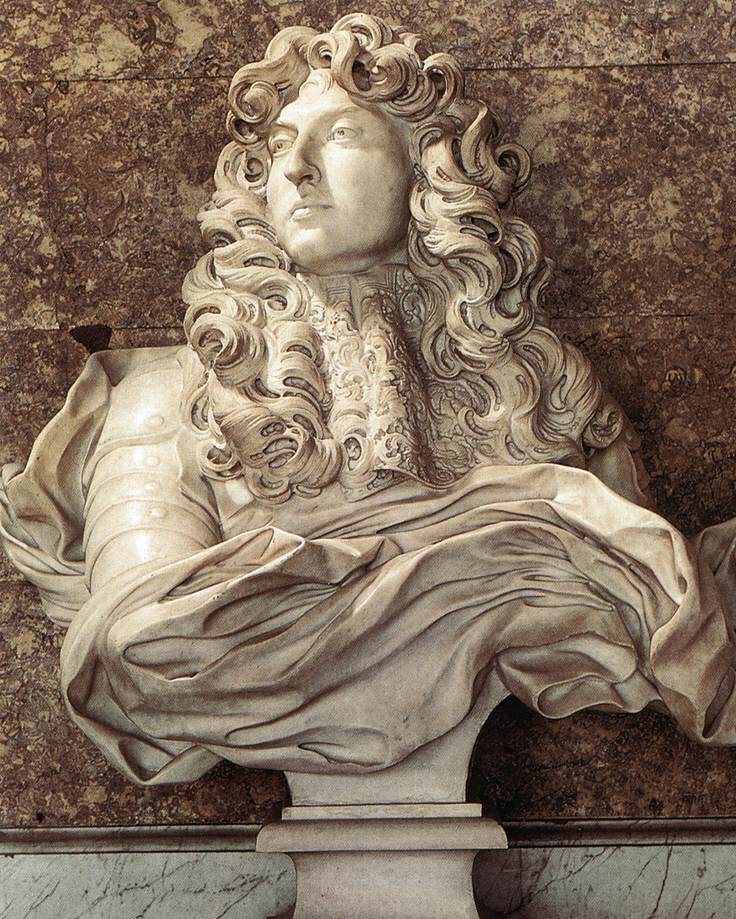
Bust of Louis XIV by Gianlorenzo Bernini

Several reasons have been suggested for the creation of the extravagant and stately palace, as well as the relocation of the monarchy's seat. The memoirist Saint-Simon speculated that Louis viewed Versailles as an isolated power centre where treasonous cabals could be more readily discovered and foiled. There has also been speculation that the revolt of the Fronde caused Louis to hate Paris, which he abandoned for a country retreat, but his sponsorship of many public works in Paris, such as the establishment of a police force and of street-lighting, lend little credence to this theory. As a further example of his continued care for the capital, Louis constructed the Hôtel des Invalides, a military complex and home to this day for officers and soldiers rendered infirm either by injury or old age. While pharmacology was still quite rudimentary in his day, the Invalides pioneered new treatments and set new standards for hospice treatment. The conclusion of the Treaty of Aix-la-Chapelle in 1668 also induced Louis to demolish Paris's northern walls in 1670 and replace them with wide tree-lined boulevards.

Louis renovated and improved the Louvre and other royal residences. Gian Lorenzo Bernini was originally to plan additions to the Louvre; however, his plans would have meant the destruction of much of the existing structure, replacing it with an Italian summer villa in the centre of Paris. Bernini's plans were eventually shelved in favour of the elegant Louvre Colonnade designed by three Frenchmen: Louis Le Vau, Charles Le Brun, and Claude Perrault. With the relocation of the court to Versailles, the Louvre was given over to the arts and the public. During his visit from Rome, Bernini also executed a renowned portrait bust of the king.

== Image and depiction ==
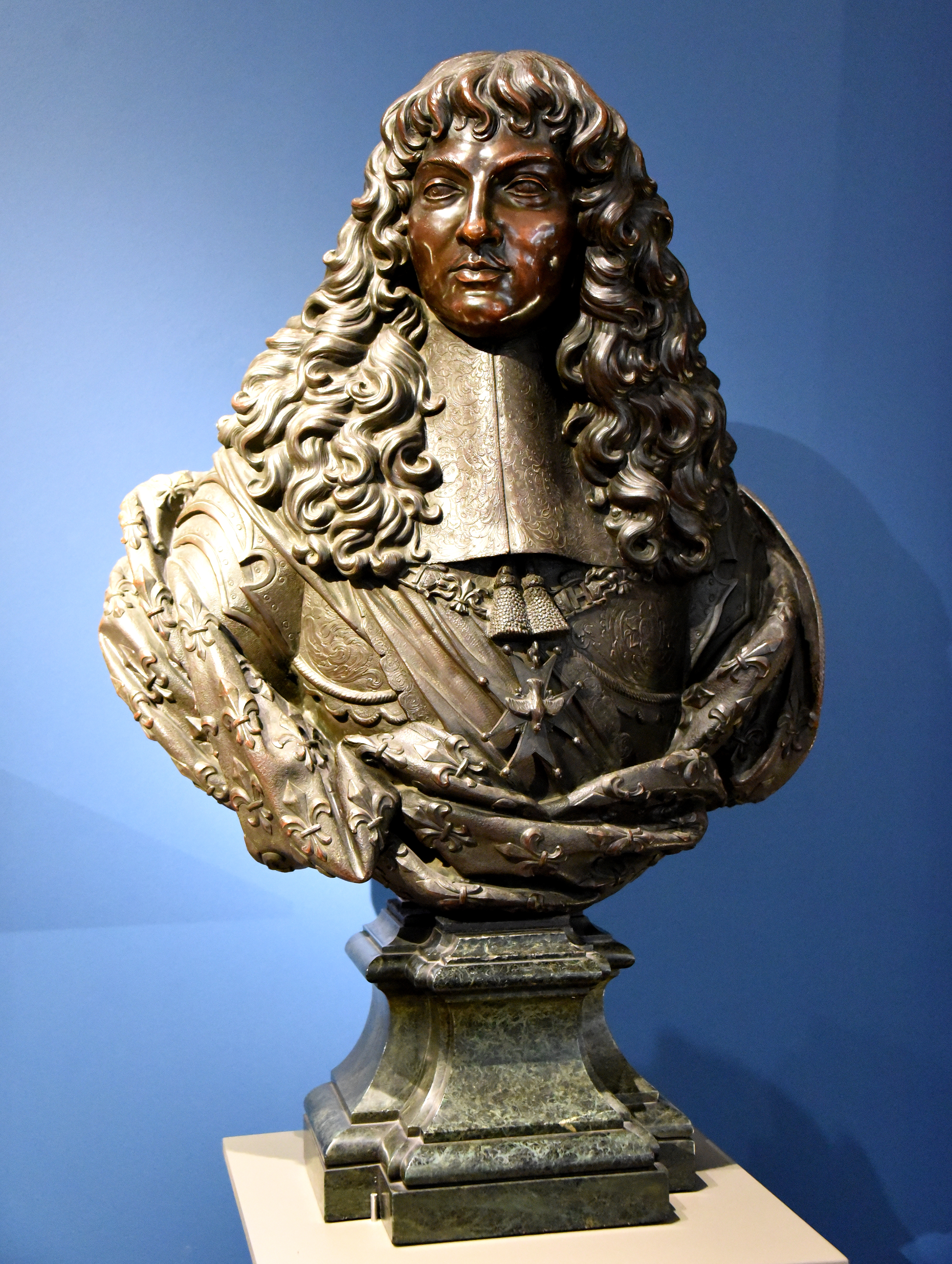
Bronze bust of Louis XIV. Circa 1660, by an unknown artist. From Paris, France. The Victoria and Albert Museum, London.

Few rulers in world history have commemorated themselves in as grand a manner as Louis. He cultivated his image as the Sun King (le Roi Soleil), the centre of the universe "without equal". Louis used court ritual and the arts to validate and augment his control over France. With his support, Colbert established from the beginning of Louis's personal reign a centralised and institutionalised system for creating and perpetuating the royal image. The King was thus portrayed largely in majesty or at war, notably against Spain. This portrayal of the monarch was to be found in numerous media of artistic expression, such as painting, sculpture, theatre, dance, music, and the almanacs that diffused royal propaganda to the population at large.

=== Evolution of royal portraiture ===
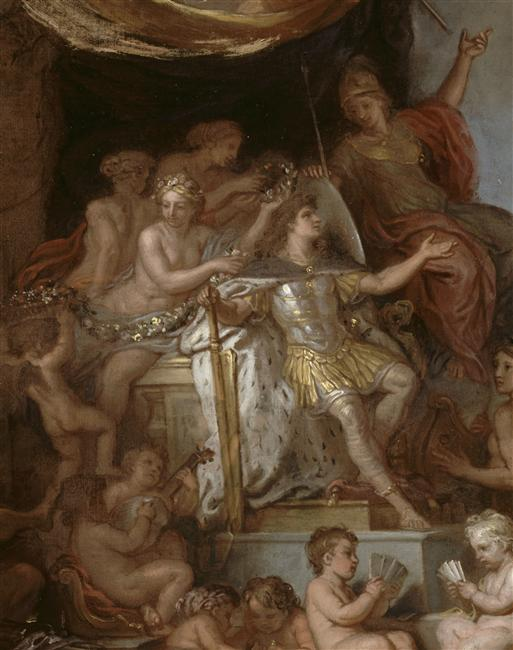
Le roi gouverne par lui-même, modello for the central panel of the ceiling of the Hall of Mirrors c. 1680 by Le Brun, (1619–1690)

Over his lifetime, Louis commissioned numerous works of art, including over 300 formal portraits. The earliest portrayals of Louis already followed the pictorial conventions of the day in depicting the child king as the majestically royal incarnation of France. This idealisation of the monarch continued in later works, which avoided depictions of the effect of smallpox that Louis contracted in 1647. In the 1660s, Louis began to be shown as a Roman emperor, the god Apollo, or Alexander the Great, as can be seen in many works of Charles Le Brun, such as sculpture, paintings, and the decor of major monuments.

Grandiose images of the king in allegorical or mythological guises followed conventions of historiated portraiture that had been common since the Renaissance. There is no better illustration of this than Hyacinthe Rigaud's 1701 Portrait of Louis XIV, where a 63-year-old Louis appears to stand on a set of unnaturally young legs.

Rigaud's portrait exemplified the height of royal portraiture during Louis's reign. Although Rigaud crafted a credible likeness of Louis, the portrait was neither meant as an exercise in realism nor to explore Louis's character. Certainly, Rigaud was concerned with detail and depicted the king's costume with great precision, down to his shoe buckle.

However, Rigaud intended to glorify the monarchy. Rigaud's original, now housed in the Louvre, was originally meant as a gift to Louis's grandson, Philip V of Spain. However, Louis was so pleased with the work that he kept the original and commissioned a copy to be sent to his grandson. That became the first of many copies, both in full and half-length formats, to be made by Rigaud, often with the help of his assistants. The portrait also became a model for French royal and imperial portraiture down to the time of Charles X over a century later. In his work, Rigaud proclaims Louis's exalted royal status through his elegant stance and haughty expression, the royal regalia and throne, rich ceremonial fleur-de-lys robes, as well as the upright column in the background, which, together with the draperies, serves to frame this image of majesty.

=== Other works of art ===
In addition to portraits, Louis commissioned at least 20 statues of himself in the 1680s, to stand in Paris and provincial towns as physical manifestations of his rule. He also commissioned "war artists" to follow him on campaigns to document his military triumphs. To remind the people of these triumphs, Louis erected permanent triumphal arches in Paris and the provinces for the first time since the decline of the Roman Empire.

Louis's reign marked the birth and infancy of the art of medallions. Sixteenth-century rulers had often issued medals in small numbers to commemorate the major events of their reigns. Louis, however, struck more than 300 to celebrate the story of the king in bronze, that were enshrined in thousands of households throughout France.

He also used tapestries as a medium of exalting the monarchy. Tapestries could be allegorical, depicting the elements or seasons, or realist, portraying royal residences or historical events. They were among the most significant means to spread royal propaganda prior to the construction of the Hall of Mirrors at Versailles.

=== Ballet ===
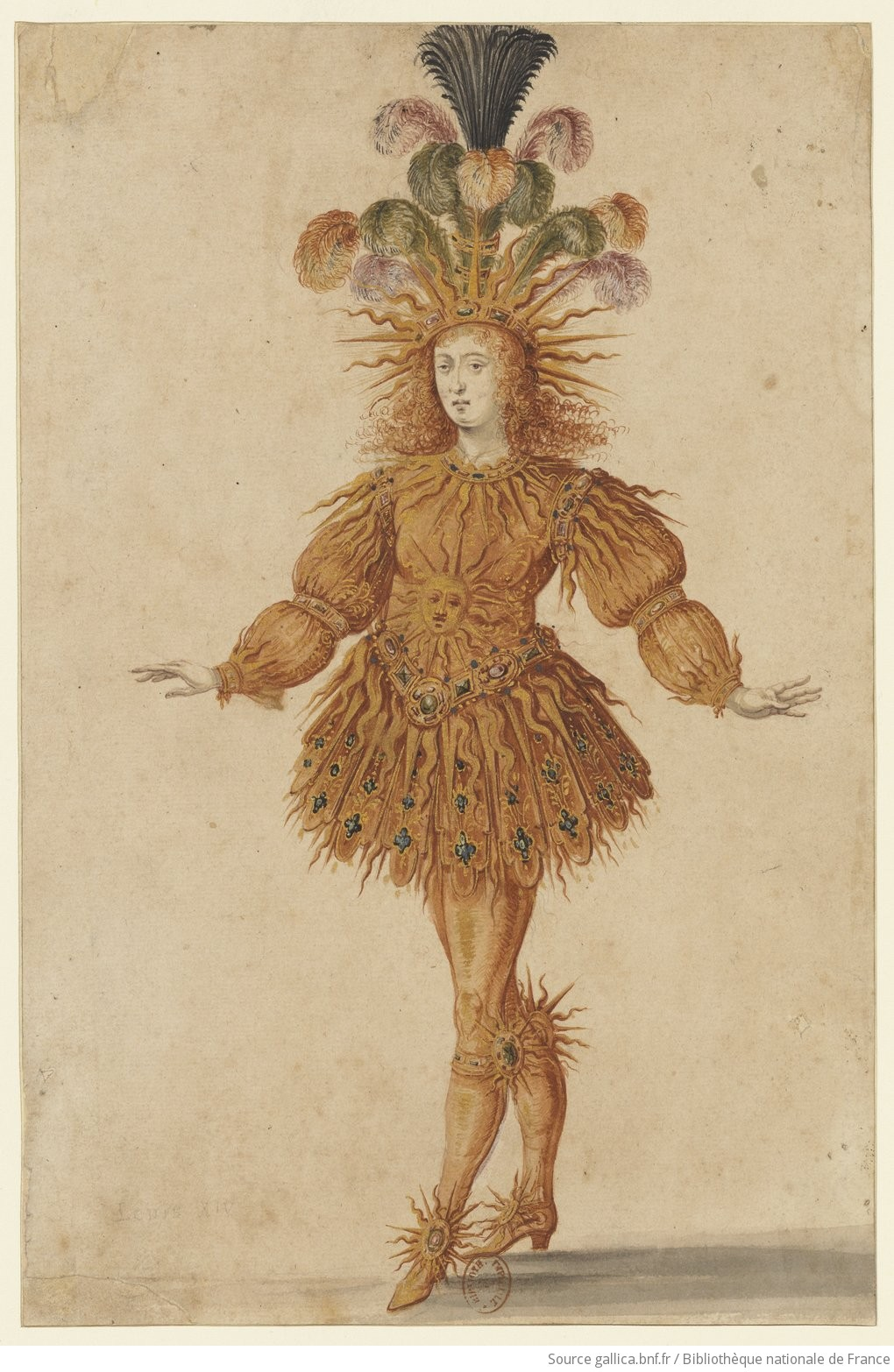
Louis XIV as Apollo in the Ballet Royal de la Nuit (1653)

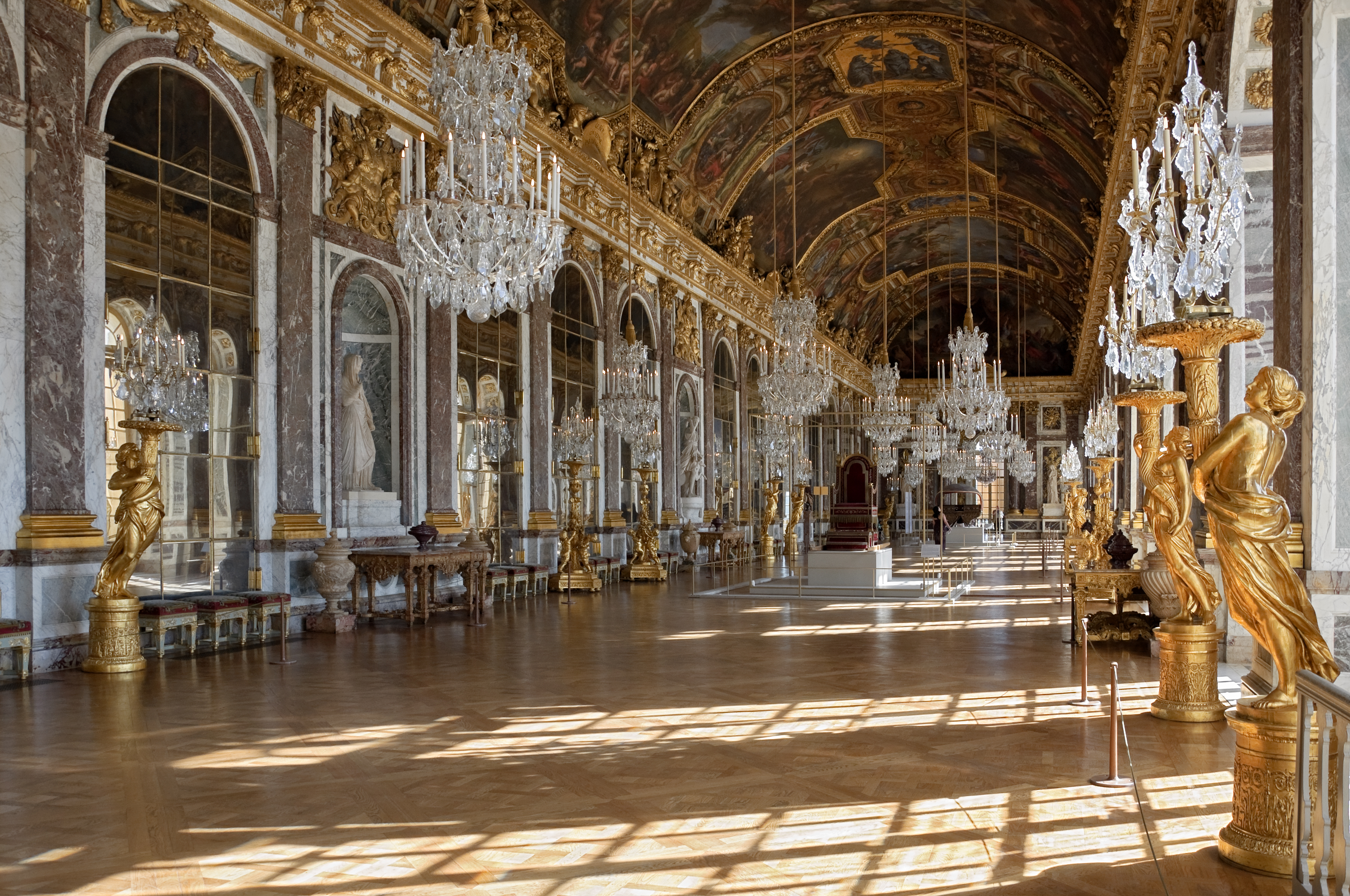
Hall of Mirrors, Palace of Versailles

Louis loved ballet and frequently danced in court ballets during the early half of his reign. In general, Louis was an eager dancer who performed 80 roles in 40 major ballets. This approaches the career of a professional ballet dancer.

His choices were strategic and varied. He danced four parts in three of Molière's comédies-ballets, which are plays accompanied by music and dance. Louis played an Egyptian in Le Mariage forcé in 1664, a Moorish gentleman in Le Sicilien in 1667, and both Neptune and Apollo in Les Amants magnifiques in 1670.

He sometimes danced leading roles that were suitably royal or godlike (such as Neptune, Apollo, or the Sun). At other times, he would adopt mundane roles before appearing at the end in the lead role. It is considered that, at all times, he provided his roles with sufficient majesty and drew the limelight with his flair for dancing. For Louis, ballet may not have merely been a tool for manipulation in his propaganda machinery. The sheer number of performances he gave as well as the diversity of roles he played may serve to indicate a deeper understanding and interest in the art form.

Ballet dancing was used by Louis as a political tool to hold power over his state. He integrated ballet deeply into court social functions and fixated his nobles' attention on upholding standards in ballet dancing, effectively distracting them from political activities. In 1661, the Royal Academy of Dance was founded by Louis to further his ambition. Pierre Beauchamp, his private dance instructor, was ordered by Louis to come up with a notation system to record ballet performances, which he did with great success. His work was adopted and published by Feuillet in 1700 as Choregraphie. This major development in ballet played an important role in promoting French culture and ballet throughout Europe during Louis's time.

Louis greatly emphasized etiquettes in ballet dancing, evidently seen in "La belle danse" (the French noble style). More challenging skills were required to perform this dance with movements very much resembling court behaviours, as a way to remind the nobles of the king's absolute power and their own status. All the details and rules were compressed in five positions of the bodies codified by Beauchamp.

=== Unofficial image ===
Besides the official depiction and image of Louis, his subjects also followed a non-official discourse consisting mainly of clandestine publications, popular songs, and rumours that provided an alternative interpretation of Louis and his government. They often focused on the miseries arising from poor government, but also carried the hope for a better future when Louis escaped the malignant influence of his ministers and mistresses, and took the government into his own hands. On the other hand, petitions addressed either directly to Louis or to his ministers exploited the traditional imagery and language of monarchy. These varying interpretations of Louis abounded in self-contradictions that reflected the people's amalgamation of their everyday experiences with the idea of monarchy.

=== In fiction ===
==== Literature ====
- Alexandre Dumas portrayed Louis in his two sequels to his 1844 novel The Three Musketeers: first as a child in Twenty Years After (1845), then as a young man in The Vicomte de Bragelonne (1847–1850), in which he is a central character. The final part of the latter novel recounts the legend that a mysterious prisoner in an iron mask was actually Louis's twin brother and has spawned numerous film adaptations generally titled The Man in the Iron Mask.
- In 1910, the American historical novelist Charles Major wrote "The Little King: A Story of the Childhood of King Louis XIV".
- Louis is a major character in the 1959 historical novel Angélique et le Roy ("Angélique and the King"), part of the Angélique series. The protagonist, a strong-willed lady at Versailles, rejects the King's advances and refuses to become his mistress. A later book, the 1961 Angélique se révolte ("Angélique in Revolt"), details the dire consequences of her defying this powerful monarch.
- A character based on Louis plays an important role in The Age of Unreason, a series of four alternate history novels written by American science fiction and fantasy author Gregory Keyes.

==== Films ====
- The film, The Taking of Power by Louis XIV (1966), directed by Roberto Rossellini, shows Louis's rise to power after the death of Cardinal Mazarin.
- The 1998 film, The Man in the Iron Mask, directed by Randall Wallace, stars Leonardo DiCaprio, who portrays Louis XIV as the primary antagonist of the film, in which depicted Louis as a king who showed no care for his people while living a lavish lifestyle and bankrupted his own country while taking in women as his personal mistresses.
- The film, Le Roi Danse (2000; translated: The King Dances), directed by Gérard Corbiau, reveals Louis through the eyes of Jean-Baptiste Lully, his court musician.
- Julian Sands portrayed Louis in Roland Jaffe's Vatel (2000).
- Alan Rickman directed, co-wrote, and stars as Louis XIV in the film, A Little Chaos, which centres on construction in the gardens of Versaille, at the time immediately before and after the death of Queen Maria Theresa.
- The 2016 film The Death of Louis XIV, directed by Albert Serra, is set during the last two weeks of Louis XIV's life before dying of gangrene, with the monarch played by Jean-Pierre Léaud.

==== Television ====
- George Blagden portrays Louis XIV in the Canal+ series Versailles which aired for three seasons from 2015.

==== Musicals ====
- Emmanuel Moire portrayed Louis XIV in the 2005-07 Kamel Ouali musical Le Roi Soleil.

== Health and death ==
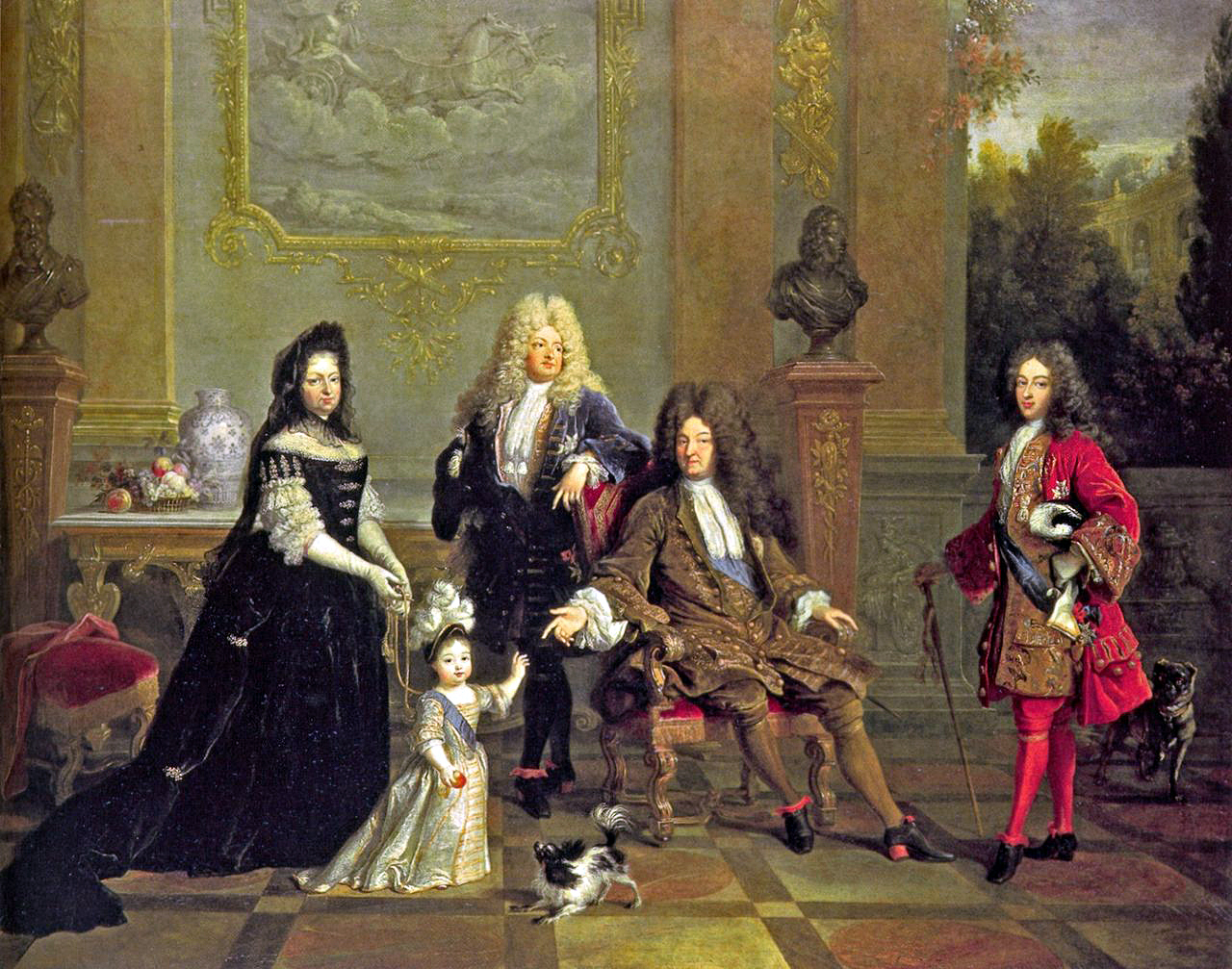
Louis XIV (seated) with his son Louis, Grand Dauphin (to the left), his grandson Louis, Duke of Burgundy (to the right), his great-grandson Louis Duke of Anjou, and Madame de Ventadour, Anjou's governess, who commissioned this painting; busts of Henry IV and Louis XIII are in the background.

Despite the image of a healthy and virile king that Louis sought to project, evidence exists to suggest that his health was not very good. He had many ailments: for example, symptoms of diabetes, as confirmed in reports of suppurating periostitis in 1678, dental abscesses in 1696, along with recurring boils, fainting spells, gout, dizziness, hot flushes, and headaches.

From 1647 to 1711, the three chief physicians to the king (Antoine Vallot, Antoine d'Aquin, and Guy-Crescent Fagon) recorded all of his health problems in the Journal de Santé du Roi (Journal of the King's Health), a daily report of his health. On 18 November 1686, Louis underwent a painful operation for an anal fistula that was performed by the surgeon Charles-François Félix de Tassy, who prepared a specially shaped curved scalpel for the occasion. The wound took more than two months to heal.

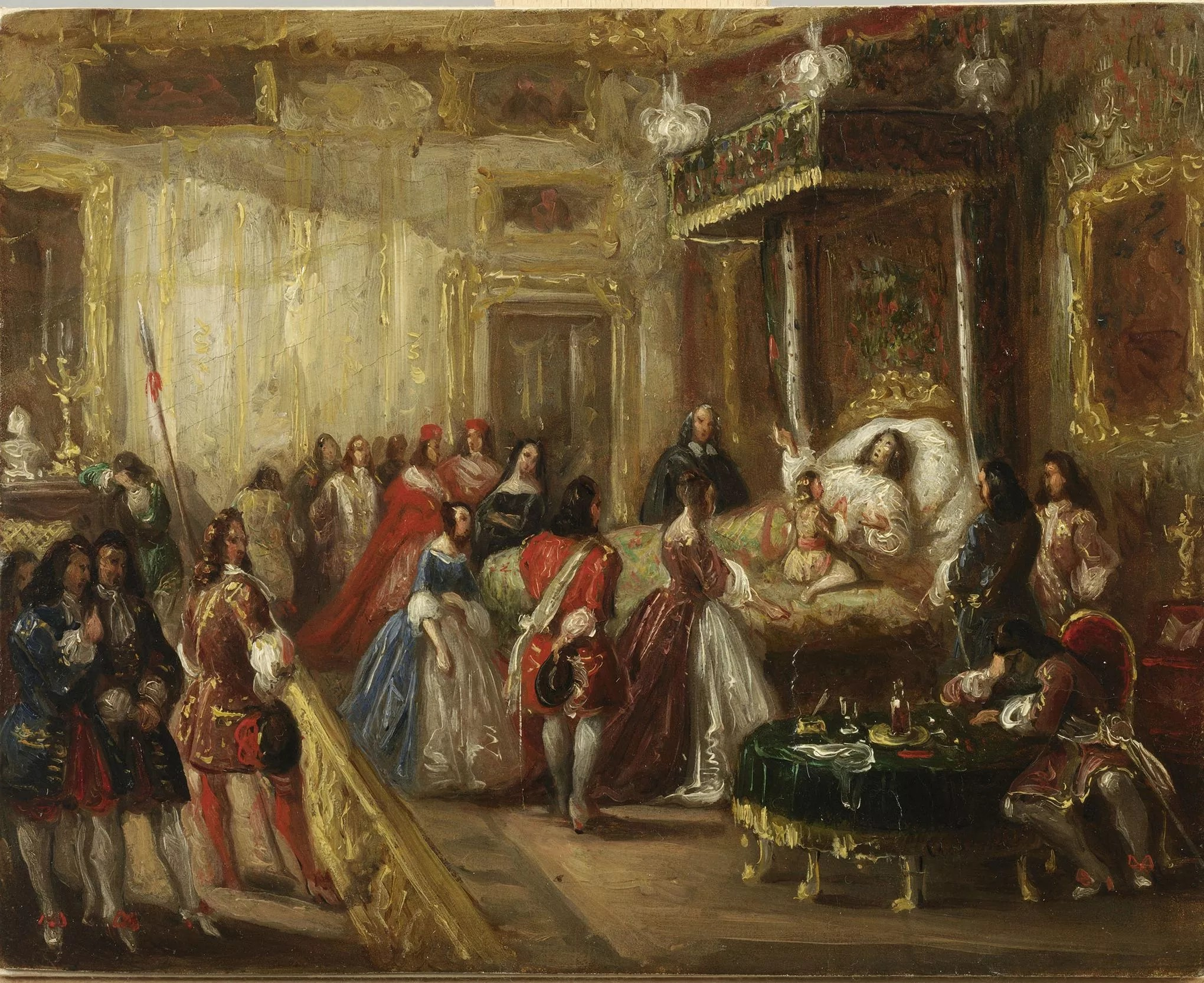
The Death of Louis XIV at the Palace of Versailles, Thomas Jones Barker, 1835–1840

Louis died of gangrene at Versailles on 1 September 1715, four days before his 77th birthday, after 72 years on the throne. Enduring much pain in his last days, he finally "yielded up his soul without any effort, like a candle going out", while reciting the psalm Deus, in adjutorium me festina (O Lord, make haste to help me). His body was laid to rest in the Basilica of Saint-Denis outside Paris. It remained there undisturbed for about 80 years until revolutionaries exhumed and destroyed all of the remains found in the Basilica. In 1848, at Nuneham House, a piece of Louis's mummified heart, taken from his tomb and kept in a silver locket by Lord Harcourt, Archbishop of York, was shown to the Dean of Westminster, William Buckland, who ate a part of it. It is reported that a part of his heart and that of Louis XIII were used to obtain mummy-brown by Martin Drolling.

Cardinal Armand Gaston Maximilien de Rohan gave Last Rites (confession, viaticum, and unction) to king Louis XIV.

=== Succession ===
Louis outlived most of his immediate legitimate family. His last surviving legitimate son, Louis, Dauphin of France, died in 1711 of smallpox and barely a year later, Louis, Duke of Burgundy, the eldest of the Dauphin's three sons and then heir-apparent to Louis, died of measles. Burgundy's elder son, Louis, Duke of Brittany, died of the same disease a few weeks later. Thus, on his deathbed, Louis's heir-apparent was his five-year-old great-grandson, Louis, Duke of Anjou, Burgundy's younger son.

Louis foresaw that his successor would not yet be mature and sought to restrict the power of his nephew Philippe II, Duke of Orléans, who, as his closest surviving legitimate relative in France, would probably become regent to the prospective Louis XV. Accordingly, the king created a regency council as Louis XIII had in anticipation of Louis XIV's own minority, with some power vested in his illegitimate son Louis-Auguste de Bourbon, Duke of Maine. Orléans, however, had Louis's will annulled by the Parlement of Paris after his death and made himself sole regent. He stripped Maine and his brother, Louis-Alexandre, Count of Toulouse, of the rank of Prince of the Blood that Louis had granted them and significantly reduced Maine's power and privileges.

==== Line of succession in 1715 ====
Below is the line of succession to the French throne at the time of the death of Louis XIV in 1715. Louis XIV's only surviving legitimate grandson, Philip V, was not included in the line of succession because he had renounced the French throne after the war of the Spanish Succession, a 13-year conflict following the death of Charles II of Spain in 1700.

- Louis XIII (1601–1643)
  - Louis XIV (1638–1715)
    - Louis, Grand Dauphin (1661–1711)
      - Louis, Duke of Burgundy (1682–1712)
        - Louis, Duke of Brittany (1707–1712)
        - (1) Louis, Duke of Anjou (1710–1774)
      - Philip V of Spain (1683–1746)
      - Charles, Duke of Berry (1686–1714)
  - Philippe I, Duke of Orléans (1640–1701)
    - (2) Philippe II, Duke of Orléans (1674–1723)
      - (3) Louis, Duke of Chartres (1703–1752)

Further down the French line of succession in 1715 was the House of Condé, followed by the House of Conti (a cadet branch of the House of Condé). Both of these royal houses were descended in the male line from Henri II, Prince of Condé, a second cousin of French King Louis XIII (the father of Louis XIV) in the male line.

== Legacy ==
=== Reputation ===
According to Philippe de Courcillon's Journal, Louis on his deathbed advised his heir with these words:

Do not follow the bad example which I have set you; I have often undertaken war too lightly and have sustained it for vanity. Do not imitate me, but be a peaceful prince, and may you apply yourself principally to the alleviation of the burdens of your subjects.

Territorial expansion of mainland France during Louis XIV's reign (1643–1715).

Some historians point out that it was a customary demonstration of piety in those days to exaggerate one's sins. Thus they do not place much emphasis on Louis's deathbed declarations in assessing his accomplishments. Rather, they focus on military and diplomatic successes, such as how he placed a French prince on the Spanish throne. This, they contend, ended the threat of an aggressive Spain that historically interfered in domestic French politics. These historians also emphasise the effect of Louis's wars in expanding France's boundaries and creating more defensible frontiers that preserved France from invasion until the Revolution.

Arguably, Louis also applied himself indirectly to "the alleviation of the burdens of [his] subjects." For example, he patronised the arts, encouraged industry, fostered trade and commerce, and sponsored the founding of an overseas empire. Moreover, the significant reduction in civil wars and aristocratic rebellions during his reign are seen by these historians as the result of Louis's consolidation of royal authority over feudal elites. In their analysis, his early reforms centralised France and marked the birth of the modern French state. They regard the political and military victories as well as numerous cultural achievements as how Louis helped raise France to a preeminent position in Europe. Europe came to admire France for its military and cultural successes, power, and sophistication. Europeans generally began to emulate French manners, values, goods, and deportment. French became the universal language of the European elite.

Louis's detractors have argued that his considerable foreign, military and domestic expenditure impoverished and bankrupted France. His supporters, however, distinguish the state, which was impoverished, from France, which was not. As supporting evidence, they cite the literature of the time, such as the social commentary in Montesquieu's Persian Letters.

Alternatively, Louis's critics attribute the social upheaval culminating in the French Revolution to his failure to reform French institutions while the monarchy was still secure. Other scholars counter that there was little reason to reform institutions that largely worked well under Louis. They also maintain that events occurring almost 80 years after his death were not reasonably foreseeable to Louis and that in any case, his successors had sufficient time to initiate reforms of their own.

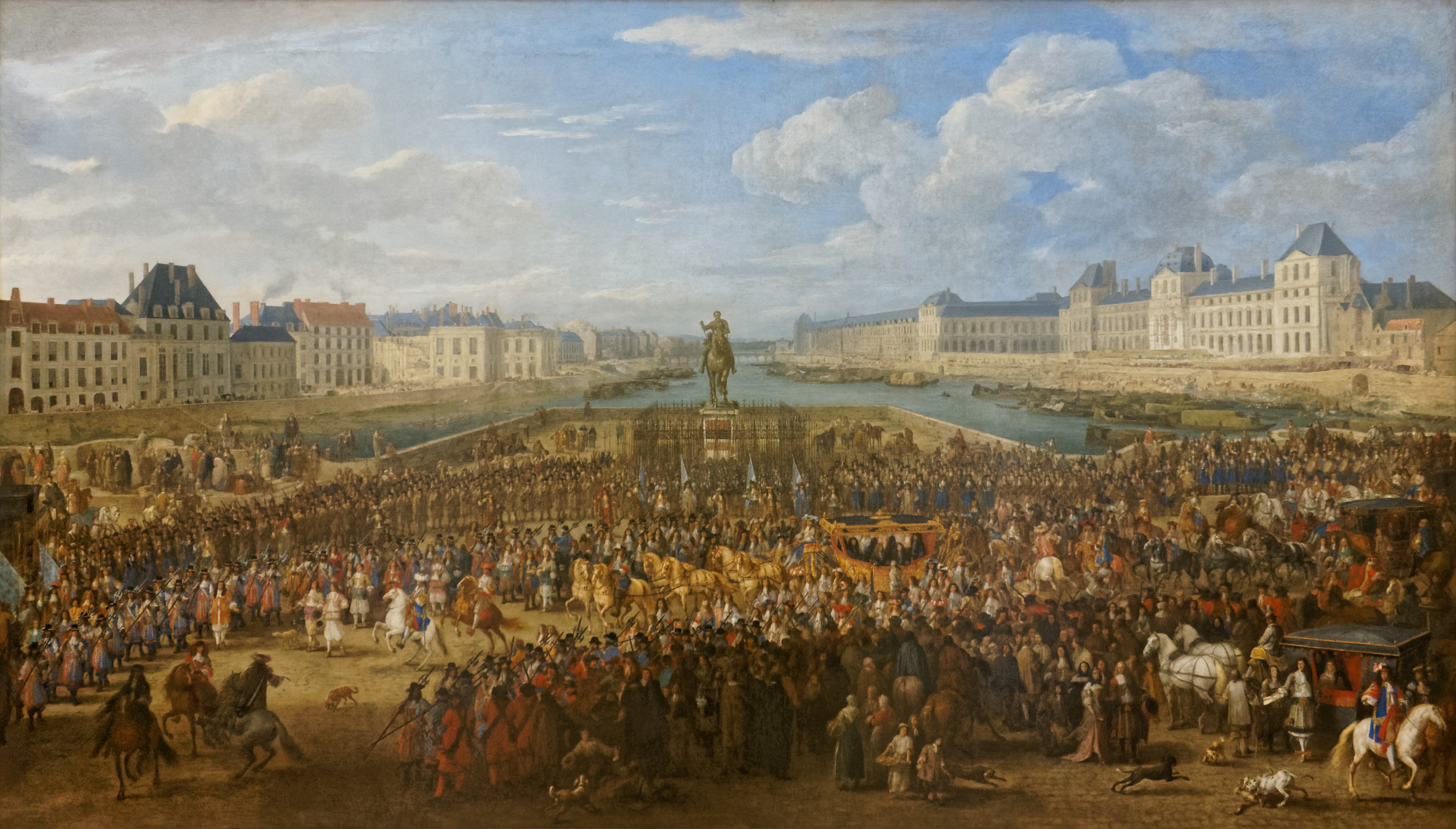
Royal procession passing the Pont-Neuf under Louis XIV

Louis has often been criticised for his vanity. The memoirist Saint-Simon, who claimed that Louis slighted him, criticised him thus:

There was nothing he liked so much as flattery, or, to put it more plainly, adulation; the coarser and clumsier it was, the more he relished it.

For his part, Voltaire saw Louis's vanity as the cause for his bellicosity:

It is certain that he passionately wanted glory, rather than the conquests themselves. In the acquisition of Alsace and half of Flanders, and of all of Franche-Comté, what he really liked was the name he made for himself.

On the other hand, Saint-Simon pointed out that, in contrast to the situation at the other European courts, Louis's birthday and that of the members of his family always went unobserved "to the point that there never was even the slightest mention of it, that day being no different from all the other days of the year".

Nonetheless, Louis has also received praise. The otherwise anti-Bourbon Napoleon described him not only as "a great king", but also as "the only King of France worthy of the name". Leibniz, the German Protestant philosopher, commended him as "one of the greatest kings that ever was". And Lord Acton admired him as "by far the ablest man who was born in modern times on the steps of a throne". The historian and philosopher Voltaire wrote: "His name can never be pronounced without respect and without summoning the image of an eternally memorable age". Voltaire's history, The Age of Louis XIV, named Louis's reign as not only one of the four great ages in which reason and culture flourished, but the greatest ever.

=== Quotes ===
Numerous quotes have been attributed to Louis XIV by legend. The well-known "I am the state" ("L'État, c'est moi") was reported from at least the late 18th century. It was widely repeated but also denounced as apocryphal by the early 19th century. (Note: The anecdote as circulated after the French Revolution, designed to illustrate the tyrannical character of the absolutism of the Ancien Régime, held that the president of the parlement began to address the king with the words Sire, l'État [...] but was cut off by the king interjecting L'État, c'est moi.) He did say, "Every time I appoint someone to a vacant position, I make a hundred unhappy and one ungrateful." Louis is recorded by numerous eyewitnesses as having said on his deathbed: "Je m'en vais, mais l'État demeurera toujours." ("I depart, but the State shall always remain.")

== Arms ==
Coat of arms of Louis XIV
Notes Upon his accession to the throne Louis assumed the royal coat of arms of France & Navarre. Adopted 1643–1715 Crest The Royal crown of France Helm An opened gold helmet, with blue and gold mantling. Escutcheon Azure, three fleurs-de-lis Or (for France) impaling Gules on a chain in cross saltire and orle Or an emerald Proper (for Navarre). Supporters The two supporters are two angels, acting as heralds for the two realms. The dexter angel carries a standard with the arms of France, and wears a tabard with the same arms. The sinister angel also carries a standard and wears a tabard, but that of Navarre. Both are standing on puffs of cloud. Motto The motto is written in gold on a blue ribbon: MONTJOIE SAINT DENIS the war cry of France, Saint Denis was also the abbey where the oriflamme was kept. Orders The escutcheons are surrounded first by the chain of the Order of Saint Michael and by the chain of the Order of the Holy Spirit, both were known as the ordres du roi. Other elements Above all is a pavilion armoyé with the Royal crown. From it, is a royal blue mantle with a semis of fleurs-de-lis Or, lined on the inside with ermine. Banner Royal standard of the king

== Order of Saint Louis ==
On 5 April 1693, Louis also founded the Royal and Military Order of Saint Louis (French: Ordre Royal et Militaire de Saint-Louis), a military order of chivalry. He named it after Louis IX and intended it as a reward for outstanding officers. It is notable as the first decoration that could be granted to non-nobles and is roughly the forerunner of the Légion d'honneur, with which it shares the red ribbon (though the Légion d'honneur is awarded to military personnel and civilians alike).

== Family ==
=== Patrilineal descent ===
Patrilineal descent

Louis' patriline is the line from which he is descended from father to son.

Patrilineal descent is the principle behind membership in royal houses, as it can be traced back through the generations - which means that if King Louis were to choose a historically accurate house name it would be Robertian, as all his male-line ancestors have been of that house.

Louis is a member of the House of Bourbon, a branch of the Capetian dynasty and of the Robertians.

Louis' patriline is the line from which he is descended from father to son. It follows the Bourbon kings of France, and the Counts of Paris and Worms. This line can be traced back more than 1,200 years from Robert of Hesbaye to the present day, through Kings of France & Navarre, Spain and Two-Sicilies, Dukes of Parma and Grand-Dukes of Luxembourg, Princes of Orléans and Emperors of Brazil. It is one of the oldest in Europe.

1. Robert II of Worms and Rheingau (Robert of Hesbaye), 770–807
2. Robert III of Worms and Rheingau, 808–834
3. Robert IV the Strong, 820–866
4. Robert I of France, 866–923
5. Hugh the Great, 895–956
6. Hugh Capet, 941–996
7. Robert II of France, 972–1031
8. Henry I of France, 1008–1060
9. Philip I of France, 1053–1108
10. Louis VI of France, 1081–1137
11. Louis VII of France, 1120–1180
12. Philip II of France, 1165–1223
13. Louis VIII of France, 1187–1226
14. Louis IX of France, 1214–1270
15. Robert, Count of Clermont, 1256–1317
16. Louis I, Duke of Bourbon, 1279–1342
17. James I, Count of La Marche, 1319–1362
18. John I, Count of La Marche, 1344–1393
19. Louis, Count of Vendôme, 1376–1446
20. Jean VIII, Count of Vendôme, 1428–1478
21. François, Count of Vendôme, 1470–1495
22. Charles de Bourbon, Duke of Vendôme, 1489–1537
23. Antoine, King of Navarre, Duke of Vendôme, 1518–1562
24. Henry IV, King of France and of Navarre, 1553–1610
25. Louis XIII, King of France and Navarre, 1601–1643
26. Louis XIV, King of France and Navarre, 1638–1715

=== Issue ===
Name	Birth	Death	Notes
By Maria Theresa, Infanta of Spain, Archduchess of Austria, Queen of France and of Navarre (20 September 1638 – 30 July 1683)
Louis, le Grand Dauphin	1 November 1661	14 April 1711	Fils de France. Dauphin of France (1661–1711). Had issue. Father of Louis, Dauphin of France, Philip V of Spain and Charles, Duke of Berry. Grandfather of Louis XV
Anne Élisabeth	18 November 1662	30 December 1662	Fille de France. Died in infancy.
Marie Anne	16 November 1664	26 December 1664	Fille de France. Died in infancy.
Marie Thérèse	2 January 1667	1 March 1672	Fille de France. Known as Madame Royale and la Petite Madame. Died in childhood.
Philippe Charles, Duke of Anjou	5 August 1668	10 July 1671	Fils de France. Died in childhood.
Louis François, Duke of Anjou	14 June 1672	4 November 1672	Fils de France. Died in infancy.

This is an incomplete list of Louis XIV's illegitimate children. He reputedly had more, but the difficulty in fully documenting all such births restricts the list only to the better-known or legitimised.

Name	Birth	Death	Notes
By NN, a gardener
Daughter	1660	unknown	She married N de la Queue, a sentry.
By Louise de La Vallière (6 August 1644 – 6 June 1710)
Charles de La Baume Le Blanc	19 December 1663	15 July 1665 (aged 1)	Not legitimised.
Philippe de La Baume Le Blanc	7 January 1665	1666 (aged 1)	Not legitimised.
Marie Anne de Bourbon	2 October 1666	3 May 1739 (aged 72)	Legitimised on 14 May 1667. Married Louis Armand I, Prince of Conti.
Louis, Count of Vermandois	3 October 1667	18 November 1683 (aged 16)	Legitimised on 20 February 1669. Held the office of Admiral of France.
By Françoise-Athénaïs, marquise de Montespan (5 October 1641 – 27 May 1707)
Louise Françoise de Bourbon	at the end of March 1669	23 February 1672 (aged 2)	
Louis Auguste, Duke of Maine	31 March 1670	14 May 1736 (aged 66)	Legitimised on 20 December 1673. Held numerous offices, of which: Colonel General of the Suisses et Grisons, Governor of Languedoc, General of the Galleys, and Grand Master of Artillery. Also Duke of Aumale, Count of Eu and Prince of Dombes. Had issue. Founder of the Maine Line. Heir presumptive for several days.
Louis César, Count of Vexin	20 June 1672	10 January 1683 (aged 10)	Legitimised on 20 December 1673.
Louise Françoise de Bourbon	1 June 1673	16 June 1743 (aged 70)	Legitimised on 20 December 1673. Married Louis III, Prince of Condé. Had issue.
Louise Marie Anne de Bourbon	12 November 1674	15 September 1681 (aged 6)	Legitimised in January 1676.
Françoise Marie de Bourbon	9 February 1677	1 February 1749 (aged 71)	Legitimised in November 1681. Married Philippe II, Duke of Orléans, the Regent of France under Louis XV. Had issue.
Louis Alexandre, Count of Toulouse	6 June 1678	1 December 1737 (aged 59)	Legitimised on 22 November 1681. Held numerous offices, of which: Admiral of France, Governor of Guyenne, Governor of Brittany, and Grand Huntsman of France. Also Duke of Damville, of Rambouillet and of Penthièvre. Had issue.
by Claude de Vin, Mademoiselle des Œillets (1637 – 18 May 1687)
Louise de Maisonblanche	c. 17 June 1676	12 September 1718 (aged 42)	In 1696 she married Bernard de Prez, Baron de La Queue.
by Angélique de Fontanges (1661 – 28 June 1681)
Son	January 1680	January 1680 (stillborn)	
Daughter	March 1681	March 1681 (stillborn)	Her existence is uncertain.

== See also ==
- Fundamental laws of the Kingdom of France
- House of France
- Levée (ceremony)
- List of French monarchs
- Outline of France
- French forestry Ordinance of 1669
- Potager du Roi
- Éléphante de Louis XIV

== Notes ==
Louis XIV House of Bourbon Cadet branch of the Capetian dynasty Born: 5 September 1638 Died: 1 September 1715
Regnal titles
Preceded by Louis XIII	King of France and Co-Prince of Andorra; 14 May 1643 – 1 September 1715	Succeeded by Louis XV
French royalty
Preceded by Louis	Dauphin of France; 5 September 1638 – 14 May 1643	Succeeded by Louis
