= Anton Egon, Prince of Fürstenberg-Heiligenberg =

Anton Egon
- Prince of Fürstenberg-Heiligenberg
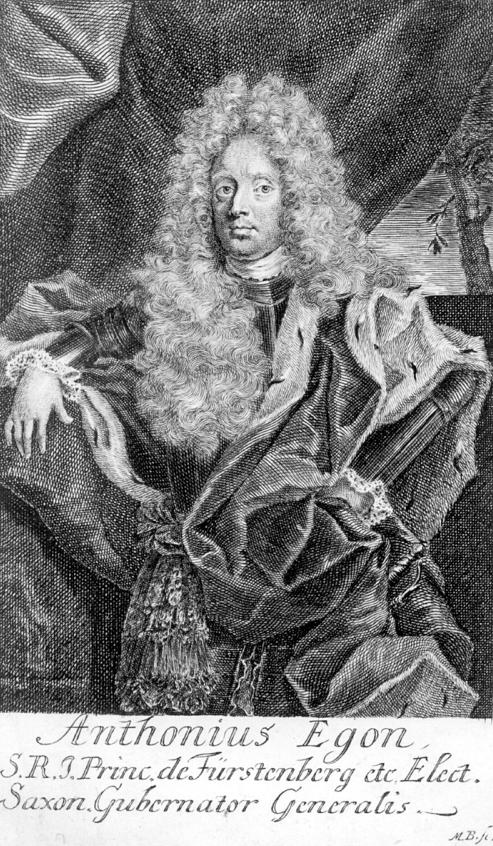
- Prince Anton Egon of Fürstenberg, 18th century engraving
- Born: 23 April 1656; Munich, Bavaria
- Died: 10 October 1716 (aged 60); Wermsdorf, Saxony
- Buried: Sankt Marienstern Abbey, Panschwitz-Kuckau
- Noble family: Fürstenberg
- Spouse: Marie de Ligny
- Father: Herman Egon, Prince of Fürstenberg-Heiligenberg
- Mother: Maria Franziska of Fürstenberg-Stühlingen

Anton Egon (23 April 1656 – 10 October 1716), a member of the Swabian House of Fürstenberg, was Imperial Prince and Princely Landgrave of Fürstenberg-Heiligenberg from 1674 until his death. He also served as governor of the Electorate of Saxony under the Wettin prince-elector Augustus II the Strong.

== Life ==
Anton Egon was born in Munich, where his father Count Herman Egon of Fürstenberg-Heiligenberg (1627–1674) served as privy councillor at the court of the Wittelsbach elector Ferdinand Maria of Bavaria. He was the eldest son from his father's marriage with his cousin, Countess Maria Franziska of Fürstenberg-Stühlingen (1638–1680). In 1664 Emperor Leopold I elevated the Fürstenberg-Heiligenberg branch to the rank of Princes of the Holy Roman Empire. Upon his father's death in 1674, Anton Egon succeeded as head of the line.

While on Grand Tour in Rome, Anton Egon received the news of his succession. He endeavoured to hold a critical distance to his spiritual uncles, the Strasbourg prince-bishops Franz Egon and Wilhelm Egon von Fürstenberg, who were declared supporters of King Louis XIV of France in the Franco-Dutch War. The young prince was declared to have reached majority in 1676; one year later, he married the wealthy French noblewoman Marie de Ligny (1656–1711). This marriage displeasured Emperor Leopold, who stripped him of his seat in the Imperial Diet and seized his Swabian estates. To regain his favour, Prince Anton Egon moved to the Habsburg court in Vienna and finally was restored in the course of the 1679 Peace of Nijmegen.

The prince spent the following years at the Bavarian court in Munich, on his mother's estates in Weitra, Austria, as well as in Paris. He again fell out with the Habsburg emperor in 1691, after the struggles of his uncle Wilhelm Egon von Fürstenberg with the Cologne archbishop Joseph Clemens of Bavaria sparked the Nine Years' War against King Louis XIV. Reconciled again, Leopold sent Anton Egon to supervise the gold mining in Hungary, where the prince met with the Győr (Raab) bishop Christian August of Saxe-Zeitz. It was the Wettin bishop, who recommended him to the Saxon court of Augustus the Strong.

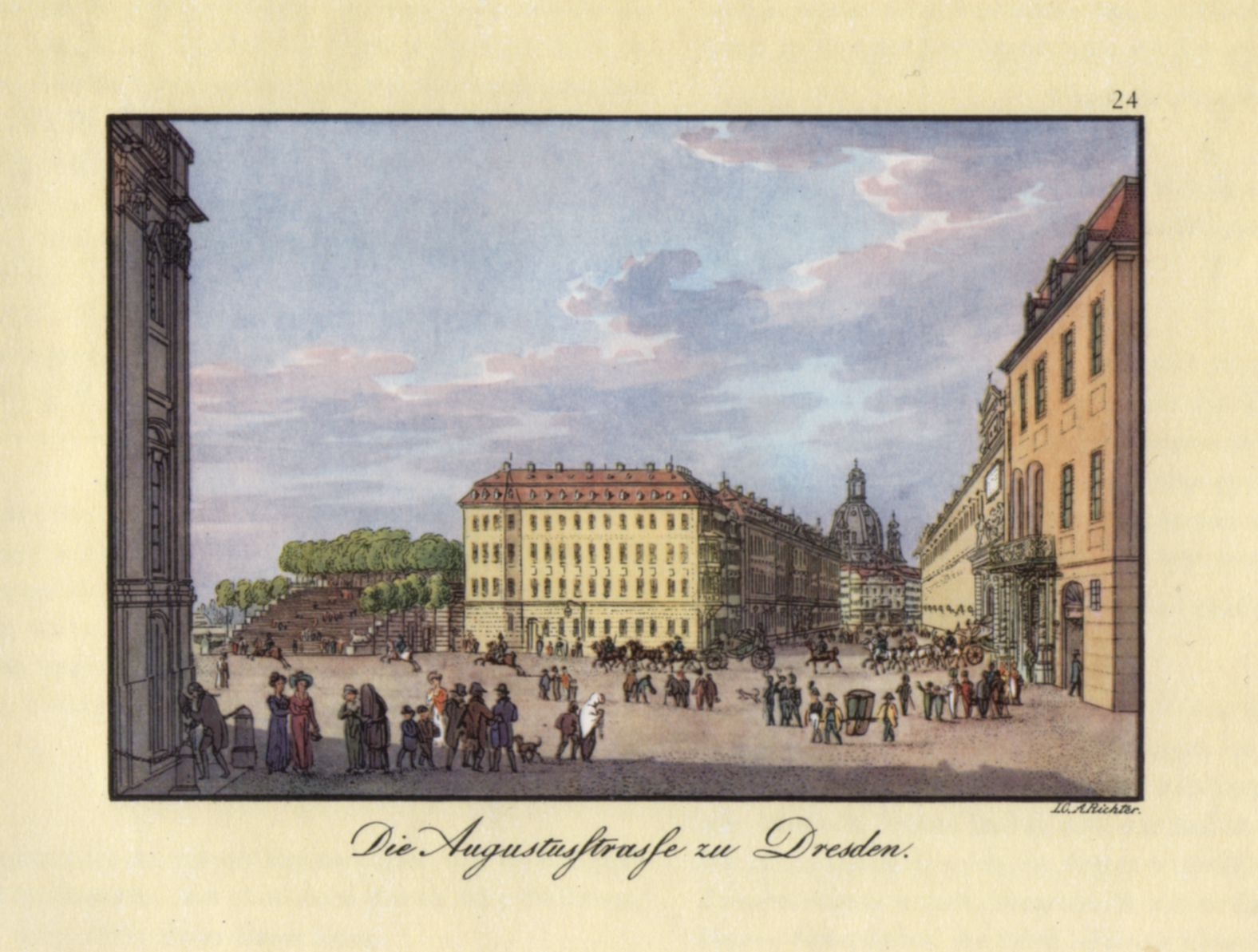
Dresden Schloßplatz with Palais Fürstenberg (1843)

In 1697, a personal union was founded between the Wettin Electorate of Saxony and the Polish–Lithuanian Commonwealth. Augustus the Strong invested large sums and even converted to Catholicism to ensure his election to the Polish throne. From 2 December 1697, Anton Egon, a Roman Catholic himself, acted as governor of the Saxon electorate while the Wettin king was in Poland. Augustus granted Anton Egon a lavish residence on Schloßplatz in Dresden, the former home of Magdalena Sibylla of Neidschutz, mistress of the late Elector John George IV. The building at the site of the present-day Sächsisches Ständehaus was then renamed Palais Fürstenberg; it temporarily accommodated the laboratories of Johann Friedrich Böttger and Ehrenfried Walther von Tschirnhaus.

As an Imperial prince, Anton Egon ranked above the local nobles, whose traditional privileges he tried to curtail. At court, he would carry out essential functions as representative of the prince-elector, who was frequently absent. A proponent of absolutism, he was always ready to protect the interests of the Saxon electoral house, though historians disagree in their assessment of his character. In his later years, Anton Egon again approached to the Saxon estates.

During the Great Northern War, King Augustus sent the prince on a diplomatic mission to Emperor Joseph I in 1706, in order to forge an alliance against the forces of King Charles XII of Sweden. After the failed Campaign of Grodno in the same year, however, the Polish crown was temporarily lost in the Treaty of Altranstädt and Prince Anton Egon's office as Saxon governor became obsolete. Though he again was appointed to this position upon the Swedish defeat at the 1709 Battle of Poltava, his actual influence on Saxon politics remained limited and he retired to his private estates in Wermsdorf.

Anton Egon died on 10 October 1716 in the Wermsdorf hunting lodge and, as a Catholic, he was buried in the Cistercian abbey of Sankt Marienstern (today part of Panschwitz-Kuckau) in Upper Lusatia. His heart was placed near the coats-of-arms of his ancestors to the left of the altar in the chapel of Heiligenberg Castle. After his death, the office of Governor of Saxony was abolished. As Prince Anton Egon left no male heirs, his Heiligenberg estates passed to the Fürstenberg-Fürstenberg main line.

== Marriage and issue ==
Anton Egon married on 11 January 1677 to Marie (1656-1711), a daughter of Jean, Marquis de Ligny and Elizabeth Boyer. The marriage produced four children:

- Philippine Louise (6 May 1680 – 16 February 1706) married in 1700 to Louis de Gand de Merode de Montmorency, Prince d'Isenghien, who was a Marshal of France
- Louise (after 1682 – after 1704) married Charles de la Noe, Marquis de Sanzelles (d. 1738)
- Francis Joseph (1682 – 1690)
- Marie Louise Mauritia (after 1682 – 16 March 1749) married 1708 Marie Jean Baptiste Colbert, Marquis de Seignelay (d. 19 February 1712), a grandson of Jean-Baptiste Colbert

== Footnotes ==
Anton Egon, Prince of Fürstenberg-Heiligenberg Fürstenberg Born: 23 April 1656 Died: 10 October 1716
Preceded by Herman Egon	Prince of Fürstenberg; 1674-1716	Succeeded by Froben Ferdinand
