= ROTK =

ROTK may refer to:

- "Record of the Three Kingdoms" (Chinese: 三國志), a historical work about the Three Kingdoms era of China
- Romance of the Three Kingdoms (Chinese: 三國演義), a classic novel written by Luo Guanzhong set in the Three Kingdoms era of China
  - Romance of the Three Kingdoms (computer game) (Japanese: 三國志, romanized: Sangokushi) a video game franchise from KOEI
  - Romance of the Three Kingdoms (TV series), a Chinese TV series
  - Romance of the Three Kingdoms (HK comic), a Hong Kong Chinese comic series
  - Romance of the Three Kingdoms (anime), an anime series
- The Return of the King (volume) of the Lord of the Rings epic high fantasy novel series by J.R.R. Tolkien
  - The Return of the King (1980 film), animated film
  - The Lord of the Rings: The Return of the King third and final installment of Peter Jackson's Lord of the Rings trilogy
    - The Lord of the Rings: The Return of the King (video game)

== See also ==
- Romance of the Three Kingdoms (disambiguation)
