= Records of the Three Kingdoms (disambiguation) =

Records of the Three Kingdoms, Sanguozhi, or Sangokushi may refer to:

- Records of the Three Kingdoms (三國志), Chinese historical text by Chen Shou
- Records of the Three Kingdoms in Plain Language (三國志平話), precursor to the Romance of the Three Kingdoms
- Romance of the Three Kingdoms (三國演義), novel based on Chen Shou's work
  - Romance of the Three Kingdoms (video game series)
  - Sangokushi (manga)
  - Three Kingdoms (manhua)
- Samguk sagi (三國史記), Korean historical text by Kim Busik written in literary Chinese, records events of the Korean Three Kingdoms period

== See also ==
- Romance of the Three Kingdoms (disambiguation)
- Three Kingdoms (disambiguation)
