= Jean Louis d'Elderen =

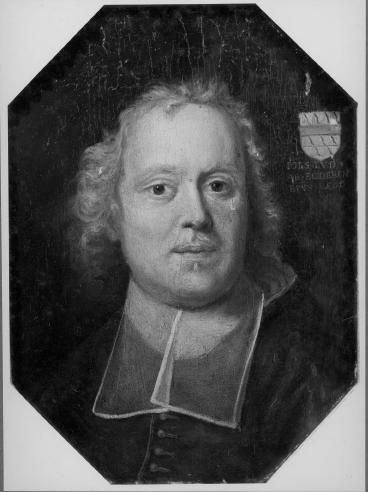
John Louis of Elderen.

Jean Louis d'Elderen (29 September 1620 – 1 February 1694) was the 63rd prince-bishop of Liège during the opening years of the War of the Grand Alliance. He was born in Tongeren.

== Life ==
Elderen was born in Tongeren, the son of Guillaume, lord of Genoels-Elderen, and Elisabeth de Warnant. He became a canon on 8 November 1636, cantor of Liège Cathedral in 1661, and dean of Liège in 1669. At Maximilian Henry of Bavaria's death in 1688 he was elected as successor despite French efforts to promote Wilhelm Egon von Fürstenberg to the see and Austrian lobbying for Joseph Clemens of Bavaria. Elderen was sworn in as ruler of the prince-bishopric on 17 August and was consecrated bishop on 27 December. Despite seeking to maintain the neutrality of Liège in the Nine Years' War, the city was occupied by allied troops and the territory was invaded by the French. On 4 June 1691 the city of Liège was bombarded by French forces commanded by Marshal Boufflers.

Catholic Church titles
Preceded by Maximilian Henry of Bavaria	Prince-Bishop of Liège; 1688–1694	Succeeded by Joseph Clemens of Bavaria
