= Three crowns =

Three Crowns refers to the three crowns of Sweden.

Three crowns may also refer to:

- College of the Three Crowns, a secondary school in Cologne, Germany
- Dunville's Three Crowns, a brand of Irish whiskey
- The Three Crowns, an Italian fairy tale written in 1634 by Giambattista Basile
- Three Crowns Books, an imprint of Oxford University Press for colonial writing
- Three Crowns Castle, in Stockholm, Sweden
- The Three Crowns Hotel in Devon, England
- Three Crowns of the Sailor (1983), French fabulist film
- Trzy Korony, the summit of the Three Crowns Massif in Poland
- Union of the Crowns of England, Scotland, and Ireland

== See also ==
- Three Kingdoms (disambiguation)
- Tre kronor (disambiguation)
- Triple Crown (disambiguation)
