= History of the Three Kingdoms =

The History of the Three Kingdoms may refer to:

- Samguk sagi (三國史記, lit. 'History of the Three Kingdoms'), Korean historical text by Kim Busik
- Records of the Three Kingdoms (三國志), Chinese historical text by Chen Shou
- Three Kingdoms period of Chinese history (220 – 280 CE)
- Three Kingdoms of Korea (57 BCE – 668 CE)
- Later Three Kingdoms period of Korean history (c. 889 or 900 CE to 936 CE)

== See also ==
- Three Kingdoms (disambiguation)
