= Fürstenberg-Heiligenberg =

Fürstenberg-Heiligenberg coat of arms

Fürstenberg-Heiligenberg was a county and later a principality in southern Baden-Württemberg, Germany, located in the historical territory of Heiligenberg. It was created as a partition of Fürstenberg-Baar in 1559, and it suffered one partition between itself and Fürstenberg-Donaueschingen in 1617.

When Herman Egon of Fürstenberg-Heiligenberg was elevated to the estate of imperial princes (Reichsfürstenstand) in 1664, Fürstenberg-Heiligenberg was raised to a principality and existed as an imperially immediate territory. It inherited Fürstenberg-Donaueschingen in 1698, but following the extinction of its branch in 1716, it was inherited by Fürstenberg-Fürstenberg.

== Counts of Fürstenberg-Heiligenberg (1559–1664) ==
- Joachim, 1559–1598
- Frederick IV, 1598–1617
- William II, 1617–1618
- Egon VIII, 1618–1635
- Co-rulers:
  - Ernst Egon, 1635–1652
  - Ferdinand Frederick Egon, 1635–1662
  - Herman Egon, 1635–1664

== Princes of Fürstenberg-Heiligenberg (1664–1716) ==
- Herman Egon, 1664–1674
- Anton Egon, 1674–1716

Herman Egon's two surviving brothers, Francis Egon and Wilhelm Egon, were also titular Princes of Fürstenberg-Heiligenberg, but they never ruled the principality.

== Bibliography ==
- Ersch, Johann Samuel (1850). "Fürstenberg". Allgemeine Encyklopädie der Wissenschaften und Künste in alphabetischer Folge (in German). Vol. 51. Leipzig: Brockhaus.
