= Herman Egon, Prince of Fürstenberg =

Herman Egon
- Prince of Fürstenberg-Heiligenberg
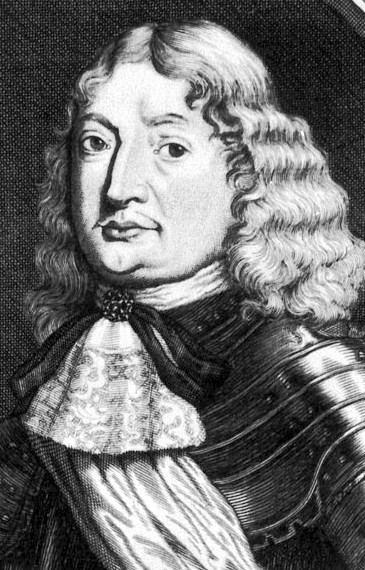
- Born: 5 November 1627
- Died: 22 September 1674 (aged 46); Munich
- Buried: Chapel of the family castle in Heiligenberg
- Noble family: Fürstenberg
- Spouse: Maria Franziska of Fürstenberg-Stühlingen
- Father: Egon VIII of Fürstenberg-Heiligenberg
- Mother: Anna Maria of Hohenzollern-Hechingen

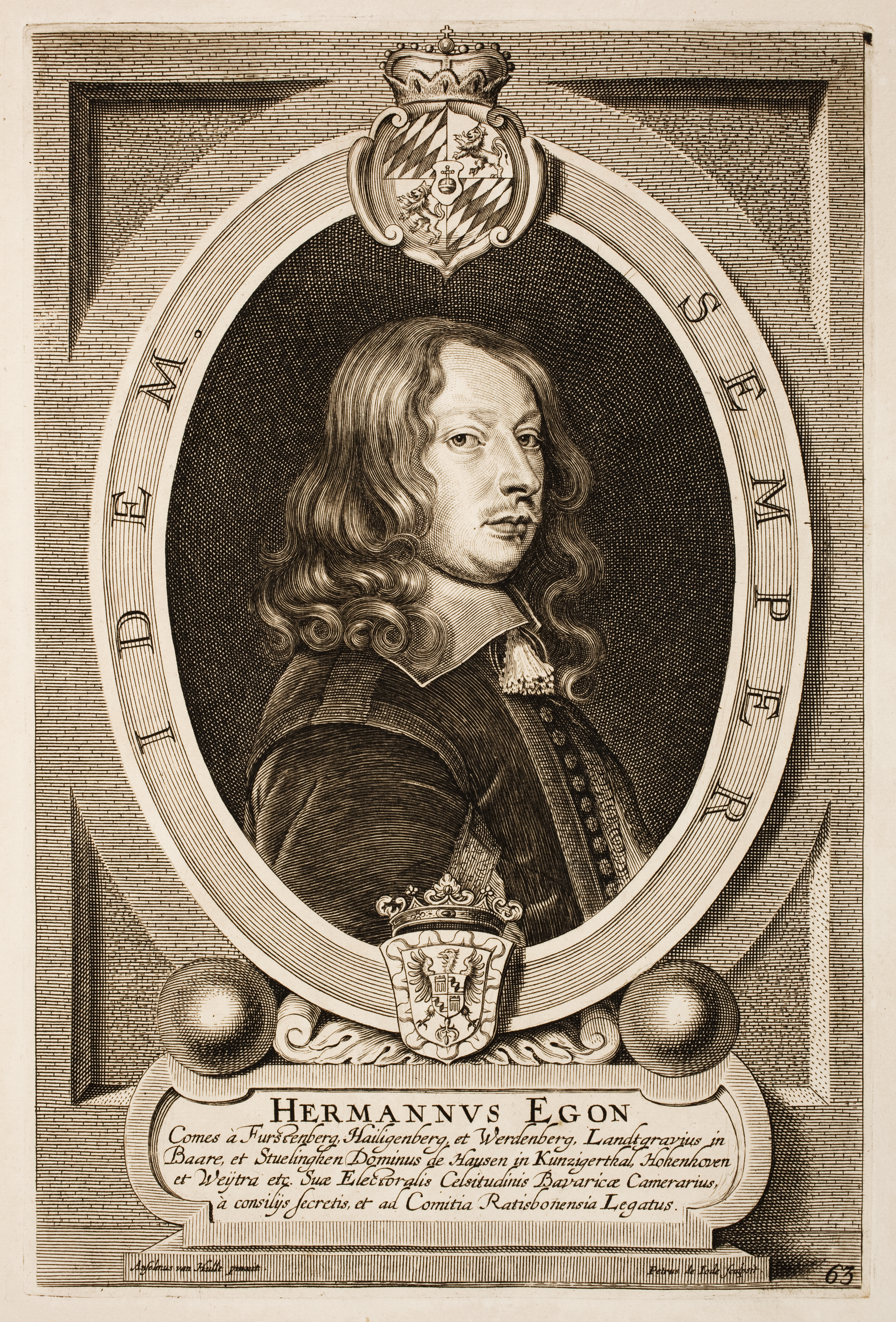
Engraving of Herman Egon

Herman Egon, Prince of Fürstenberg-Heiligenberg (5 November 1627 – 22 September 1674 in Munich) was Hofmeister, Chamberlain, Privy Councillor and Hofmarschall to Elector Ferdinand Maria of Bavaria. With his brothers Francis Egon and Wilhelm Egon, he played an important role in the imperial election of 1658 in Frankfurt. In 1664, Herman Egon and his brothers were elevated to Imperial Princes.

== Life and career ==
Herman Egon was the fourth son of Egon VIII of Fürstenberg-Heiligenberg and his wife, Countess Anna Maria of Hohenzollern-Hechingen (1603–1652). He studied in Cologne from 1639 to 1643, then spent two years at the University of Leuven. In 1651, he became a secret councillor at the court of Elector Maximilian I of Bavaria.

In 1655, his brothers Francis Egon and Wilhelm Egon, who were both bishops, left Fürstenberg-Heiligenberg to him, in exchange for monetary compensation. In 1657, he made a similar arrangement with his older brother, Ferdinand Frederick Egon.

The members of the Fürstenberg family were Imperial Counts. In 1664, Emperor Leopold raised Herman Egon and his brothers Franz Egon and Wilhelm Egon to the rank of Imperial Prince.

In 1672, he advised the Elector of Bavaria against entering the Franco-Dutch War. This made him fall from grace with Emperor Leopold I. He died on 22 September 1674 in Munich and was buried in the chapel of the family castle in Heiligenberg.

== Marriage and issue ==
In 1655, Herman Egon was married in Stühlingen with Countess Maria Franziska of Fürstenberg-Stühlingen (d. 24 August 1680 in Weitra), daughter of Frederick Rudolf, Count of Fürstenberg-Stühlingen by his second wife, Countess Anna Magdalena of Hanau-Lichtenberg With her, he had eight children:

- Anton Egon (23 April 1656 - 10 October 1716), succeeded his father as ruler of Fürstenberg-Heiligenberg
- Felix Egon (25 November 1657 - 5 March 1686 in Cologne), High Provost of the Electorate of Cologne
- Anna Adelaide (16 January 1659 - 13 November 1701 in Brussels), married Eugen Alexander Franz, 1st Prince of Thurn and Taxis
- Maria Franziska (17 September 1660 - 8 June 1691), married William Hyacinth, Prince of Nassau-Siegen
- Max Egon Ferdinand (24 October 1661 - 6 May 1696 in Paris), French general
- Emanuel Franz Egon (7 March 1663 - 6 September 1688 outside Belgrade), Imperial colonel; married Katharine Charlotte von Wallenrodt (mistress of his uncle Wilhelm Egon von Fürstenberg) in 1685
- A daughter (b. and d. 5 June 1665)
- John Egon (25 April 1667 - bef. 1670)

== Footnotes ==
Herman Egon, Prince of Fürstenberg Fürstenberg Born: 5 November 1627 Died: 22 September 1674
Preceded by Egon VIII as Landgrave of Fürstenberg-Heiligenberg	Prince of Fürstenberg; 1635-1674	Succeeded by Anton Egon
