= Four Nations =

Four Nations may refer to the following articles:

== Sport ==
Events named the Four Nations or Four Nations Tournament:

=== Association football ===
- Four-Nations Tournament (1944), a friendly tournament hosted by Curaçao
- Four Nations Tournament (1979–2008), a former semi-professional association football tournament in Europe
- Four Nations Tournament (women's football), hosted by China since 1998
- Nations Cup (football) or 4 Associations Tournament, a men's football competition in the British Isles
- Four Nations Tournament (1988), a one-off men's football event in West Berlin
- Four Nations Tournament (China), a former men's football tournament in China
- Under-20 Four Nations Tournament in men's football, a European U20s competition
- 2008 Swaziland Four Nations Tournament in men's football, an African invitational event
- 2018 Four Nations Tournament, between Angola, South Africa, Zambia and Zimbabwe
- 2021 Four Nations Football Tournament is a friendly football tournament between Bangladesh, Maldives, Seychelles and Sri Lanka.
- 2023 Mauritius Four Nations Cup is a friendly football tournament between Djibouti, Kenya, Mauritius and Pakistan.
- 2024 Four Nations Football Tournament is a friendly football tournament between Kenya, Malawi, Zambia and Zimbabwe.

=== Rugby union ===
- The Rugby Championship in the Southern hemisphere, first held in 2012; successor to the Tri Nations
- Home Nations Championship (1883–1909 and 1932–39) in Britain and Ireland; now the Six Nations Championship
- Pacific Four Series in women's international rugby union

=== Ice hockey ===
- 4 Nations Cup, tournament held between four major national teams in women's ice hockey
- 4 Nations Face-Off, international men's ice hockey tournament organized by the National Hockey League (NHL) in 2025

=== Other sports ===
- Rugby League Four Nations, with Australia, England, New Zealand and a fourth team
- Four Nations Chess League in the UK, including players from elsewhere
- Four Nations Tournament (handball) International friendly handball tournament held yearly in Brazil
- 4 Nations Netball Cup

== Other uses ==
- Nations of the United Kingdom
- The Four Nations Alliance in the science fiction novel Crest of the Stars by Hiroyuki Morioka

== See also ==
- Tri Nations (disambiguation)
