= Egon VIII of Fürstenberg-Heiligenberg =

Bavarian Field-marshal

Egon VIII
- Count of Fürstenberg-Heiligenberg
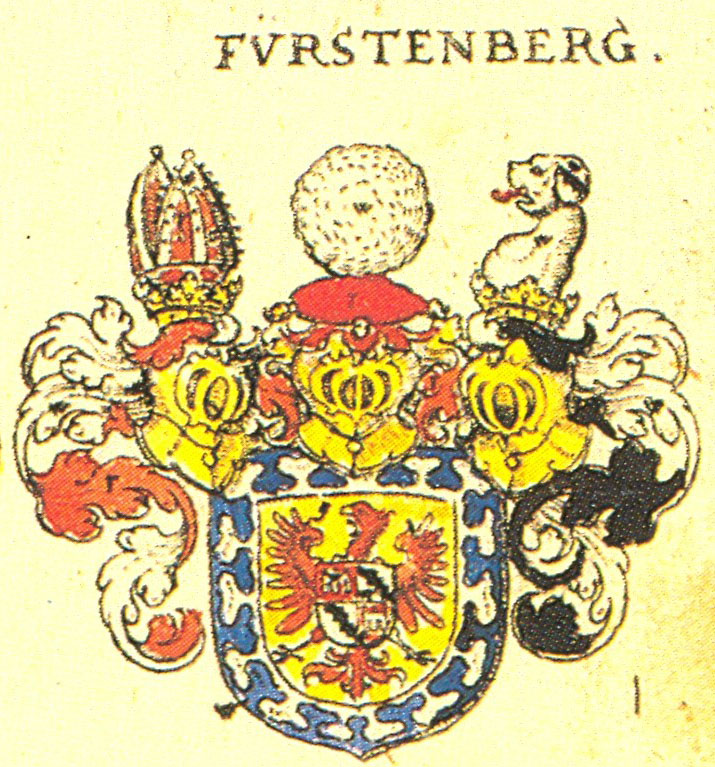
- Coat of arms of Fürstenberg
- Predecessor: Frederick IV of Fürstenberg
- Successor: Herman Egon, Prince of Fürstenberg
- Born: Ernst Egon of Fürstenberg-Heiligenberg; 1588
- Died: 1635 (aged 46–47)
- Noble family: Fürstenberg
- Spouse: Anna Maria of Hohenzollern-Hechingen
- Issue: see below
- Father: Landgrave Frederick IV of Fürstenberg
- Mother: Countess Elisabeth of Sulz

Egon VIII of Fürstenberg-Heiligenberg (Ernst Egon; 21 March 1588 in Speyer – 24 August 1635 in Constance) was Imperial Count of Fürstenberg-Heiligenberg (1618–1635) and Bavarian Field-marshal, and an important military leader in the Thirty Years' War.

== Early life ==
By birth, member of an old House of Fürstenberg, Egon was the son Frederick IV of Fürstenberg (1563–1617) and his wife, Countess Elizabeth of Sulz (1562/63-1601).

== Career ==
Presumably the third son of the couple, Egon held several church offices. He was Chorbishop of Magdeburg and Strasbourg, treasurer and prebendary, Provost at St. Gereon in Cologne and of Archduke Leopold, Bishop of Passau and Strasbourg, Council and the governor in the autonomous Cathedral district of Rouffach.

By imperial letters patent of 9 September 1619, he was made a warlord of the Catholic League (German) during the Thirty Years War. In 1631, Egon of Fürstenberg enforced the Edict of Restitution in Franconia and Württemberg. Together with Johann von Aldringen, he waged war on Württemberg after the Peace of Cherasco, which forced the Duke of Württemberg to submit to the emperor and to distance himself from the decisions of the Leipzig convention. On 14 September 1631, during the siege of Leipzig, he commanded the right wing of the imperial troops led by General Tilly.

== Marriage and descendants ==
Egon married Countess Anna Maria of Hohenzollern-Hechingen (1605–1652), the daughter of Prince Georg of Hohenzollern-Hechingen. They had seven sons and four daughters:

- Eleonore (born: 1620; died young).
- Elisabeth (1621–1662), married Ferdinand Count of Aspremont-Lynden und Reckheim (1611–1665).
- Ferdinand Frederick Egon (1623–1662), Imperial Reichshofrat and colonel.
- Leopold Ludwig Egon (1624–1639), died before the age of 15 at Dietenhofen in the imperial service.
- Franz Egon (1626–1682), Bishop of Strasbourg.
- Herman Egon (1627–1674), Prince of Fürstenberg-Heiligenberg from 1664.
- Johann Egon (1628–1629).
- Wilhelm Egon (1629–1704), Bishop of Strasbourg as a successor to his brother Franz Egon.
- Ernst Egon (1631–1652 in the Siege of Étampes).
- Maria Franziska (1633–1702), married Wolfgang William, Count Palatine of Neuburg, and after his death Leopold Wilhelm of Baden-Baden.
- Anna Maria (1634–1705), married Ferdinand Karl, Count of Löwenstein-Wertheim-Rochefort.

== Sources ==
- Theatrum Europaeum, Vol 2, Frankfurt am Main, 1646, p. 396 online]
- Fickler, Carl Borromäus Alois (1844). Kurze Geschichte der Häuser Fürstenberg, Geroldseck und von der Leyen. Karlsruhe: E. Macklot. p. 17.
- Münch, Ernst Hermann Joseph; Fickler, Carl Borromäus Alois (1829). Geschichte des Hauses und Landes Fürstenberg. Vol. 1. Aachen and Leipzig: J. A. Mayer. pp. 322–368.
