= Tri Nations =

Generally, Tri Nations refers to a sports competition between three national representative teams.

3 Nations, Tri Nations, or variation, may refer to:

== Sports ==
=== Rugby ===
In rugby union

- Tri Nations (rugby union), between Australia, New Zealand and South Africa (superseded by The Rugby Championship)
- Pacific Tri-Nations, between Fiji, Samoa and Tonga
- North African Tri Nations, between Algeria, Morocco and Tunisia

In rugby league

- Rugby League Tri-Nations, between Australia, New Zealand and Great Britain
- Rugby League European Championship B, the inaugural edition was referred to as the Central Europe Development Tri-nations

=== Other sports ===
- Three Nations Senior Lacrosse League
- Beach Cricket Tri-Nations series
- Tri Nations (association football)
- 3 Nations Cup in women's ice hockey

== Other uses ==
- Republic of Three Nations, a proposed country composed of Poland, Lithuania and Ruthenia
- Union of Three Nations, an upper classes pact against the peasantry in Transylvania
- Three Nations Crossing, a bridge in Canada, Akwesasne, USA
- Three-Nations Research Institute, a Japanese research company
- "Three Nations", a song by 21 Savage, Natanael Cano, and French Montana from Official FIFA World Cup 2026 Album, 2026

== See also ==
- Three Kingdoms (disambiguation)
- Four Nations (disambiguation)
