= Three Kingdoms (disambiguation) =

The Three Kingdoms period (220–280) was the tripartite division of China among the states of Wei, Shu, and Wu.

Three Kingdoms may also refer to:

== History and geography ==
- The Three Kingdoms of Korea, (57 BC – 668), a period in Korean history
- The Later Three Kingdoms of Korea: Silla, Later Baekje, and Taebong from 892 to 936
- The Tripartite Struggle (785–816), conflict between three major Indian kingdoms.
- The Kingdom of Georgia, which broke in 1490 into three independent kingdoms: the Kingdom of Kartli, the Kingdom of Kakheti and the Kingdom of Imereti
- The Era of Three Kings, an era in the history of Estonia from 1561 to 1625/1629 when Estonia was divided between Sweden, Poland–Lithuania and Denmark
- The three kingdoms in the British Isles, originally at least nominally independent, that became the United Kingdom of Great Britain and Ireland from 1801 to 1922. The three kingdoms involved were the Kingdom of England, the Kingdom of Scotland and the Kingdom of Ireland
  - The Wars of the Three Kingdoms from 1639 to 1651 (civil wars in each of the kingdoms, leading to a short-lived republic, the Commonwealth of England, Scotland and Ireland).
- The Kalmar Union, uniting the "Three Crowns" of medieval Scandinavia
- The Kingdom of Lan Xang, which broke in 1707 into three independent kingdoms: the Kingdom of Luang Prabang, the Kingdom of Vientiane and the Kingdom of Champasak
- After the reign of Cotys I, the Odrysian Kingdom collapsed into three different dynasties until its conquest by Philip II of Macedon
- The Three Kingdoms (Nepal), from 1484, when the country was divided into Bhadgaon, Kathmandu, and Patan

== Biology ==
- Three-domain system, initially called three "kingdoms", a classification of cellular life forms

== Media ==
- Records of the Three Kingdoms, 3rd century historical text by Chen Shou
- Romance of the Three Kingdoms, 14th century historical novel by Luo Guanzhong
- Three Kingdoms (manhua), series of graphic novels by Hong Kong artist Lee Chi Ching, published in the 1990s
- Romance of the Three Kingdoms (TV series), 1994 Chinese TV series
- Three Kingdoms (TV series), 2010 Chinese TV series
- Three Kingdoms: Resurrection of the Dragon, 2008 Hong Kong film
- Zimiamvia, the Kingdoms of Fingiswold, Meszria and Rerek in the Zimiamvian Trilogy by E. R. Eddison
- 1 Kings, known as 3 Kingdoms (Ancient Greek: Βασιλειῶν Γʹ) in the Septuagint

== Games ==
- Legends of the Three Kingdoms, a Chinese card game
- Portal Three Kingdoms, starter level set of the card game Magic: The Gathering
- Romance of the Three Kingdoms (video game series), by Koei, based on the Chinese novel and other folklore
- 3Kingdoms, a MUD, or text-based online role-playing game
- Three Kingdoms: Fate of the Dragon, a PC strategy game
- Three Kingdoms Online, a MMO SLG strategy browser game
- Total War: Three Kingdoms, a video game in the Total War series, released in May 2019

== See also ==
- The Three Crowned Kings, of the Sangam period (3rd century BC to 3rd century CE) in ancient Tamilakam in South Asia
- Sanzan period: three polities of 14th-century Ryukyu Islands
- Records of the Three Kingdoms (disambiguation)
- Romance of the Three Kingdoms (disambiguation)
- Three crowns (disambiguation)
- Tri Nations (disambiguation) including "3 Nations"
