= Schloss Heiligenberg (Heiligenberg) =

Coordinates: 47°49′0″N 9°18′36″E

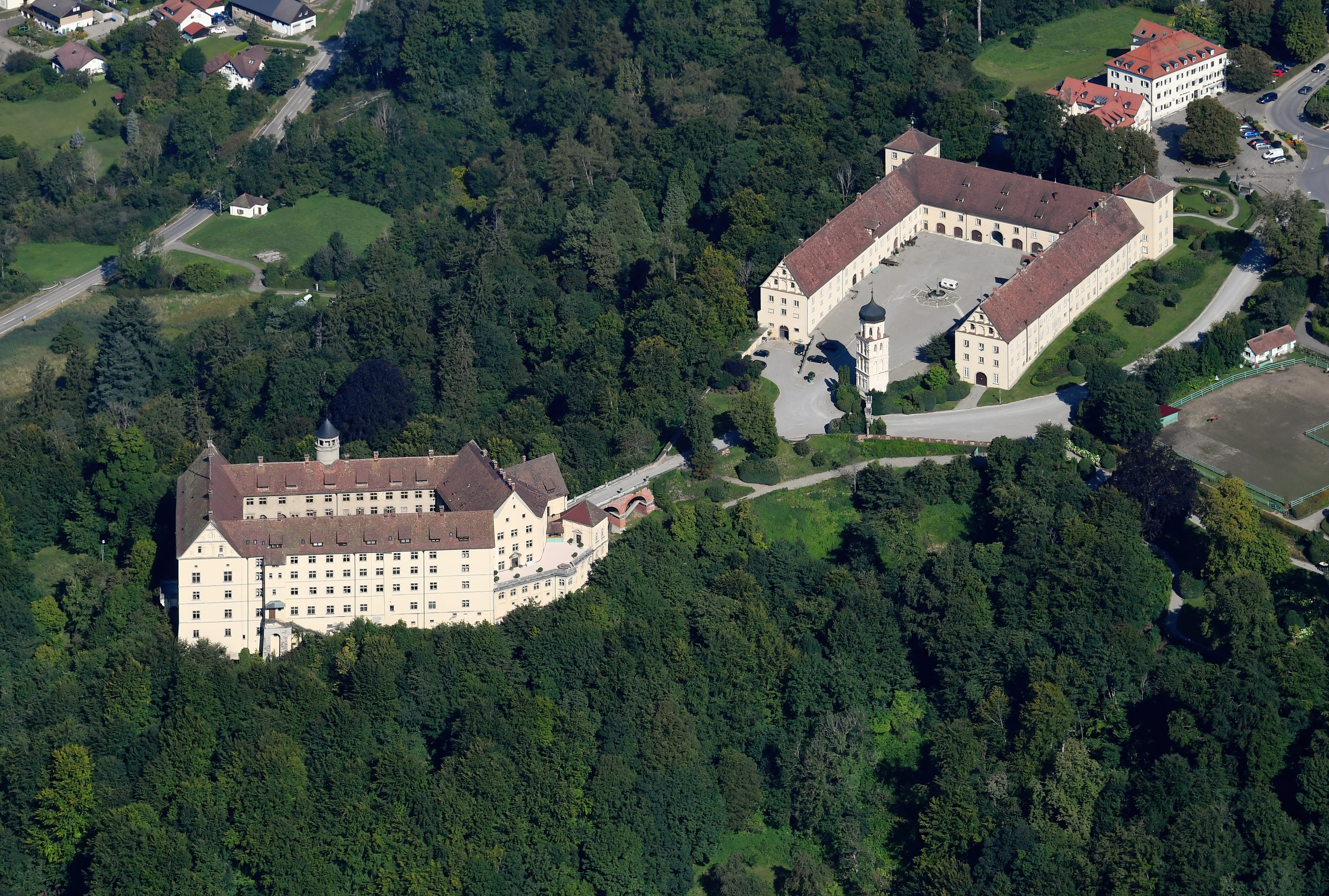
Aerial view of Schloss Heiligenberg

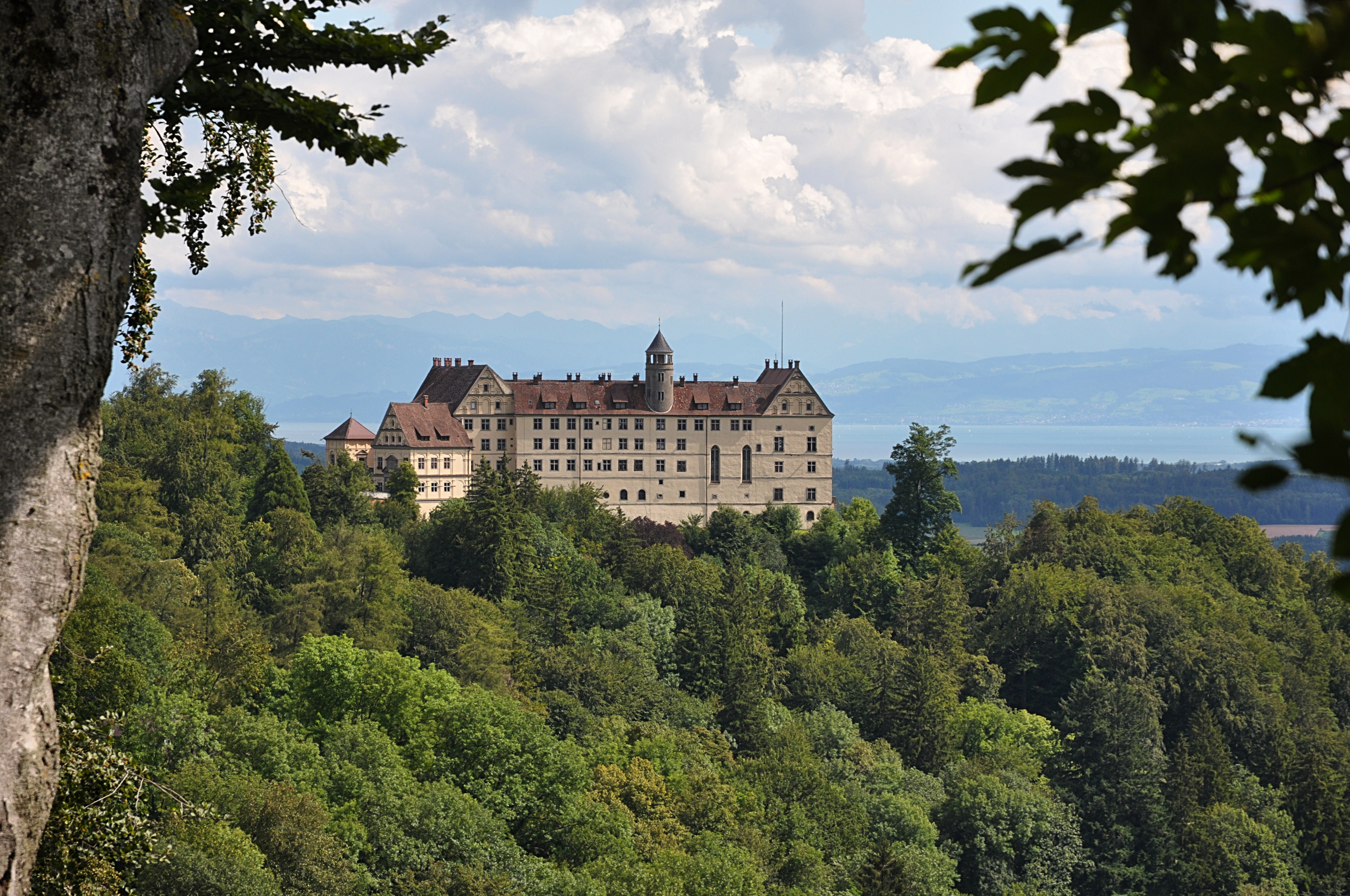
Schloss Heiligenberg

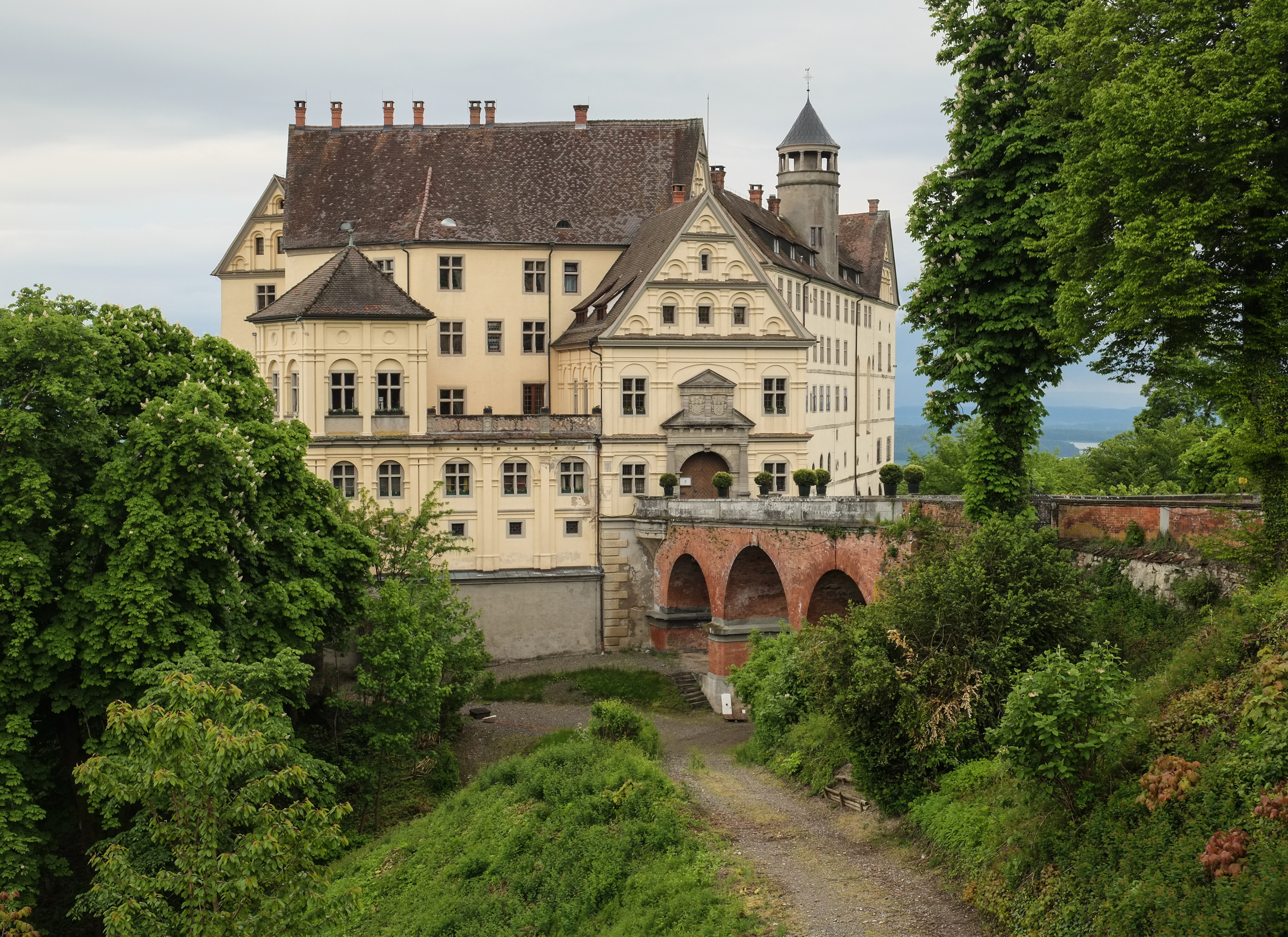
The entrance of Schloss Heiligenberg

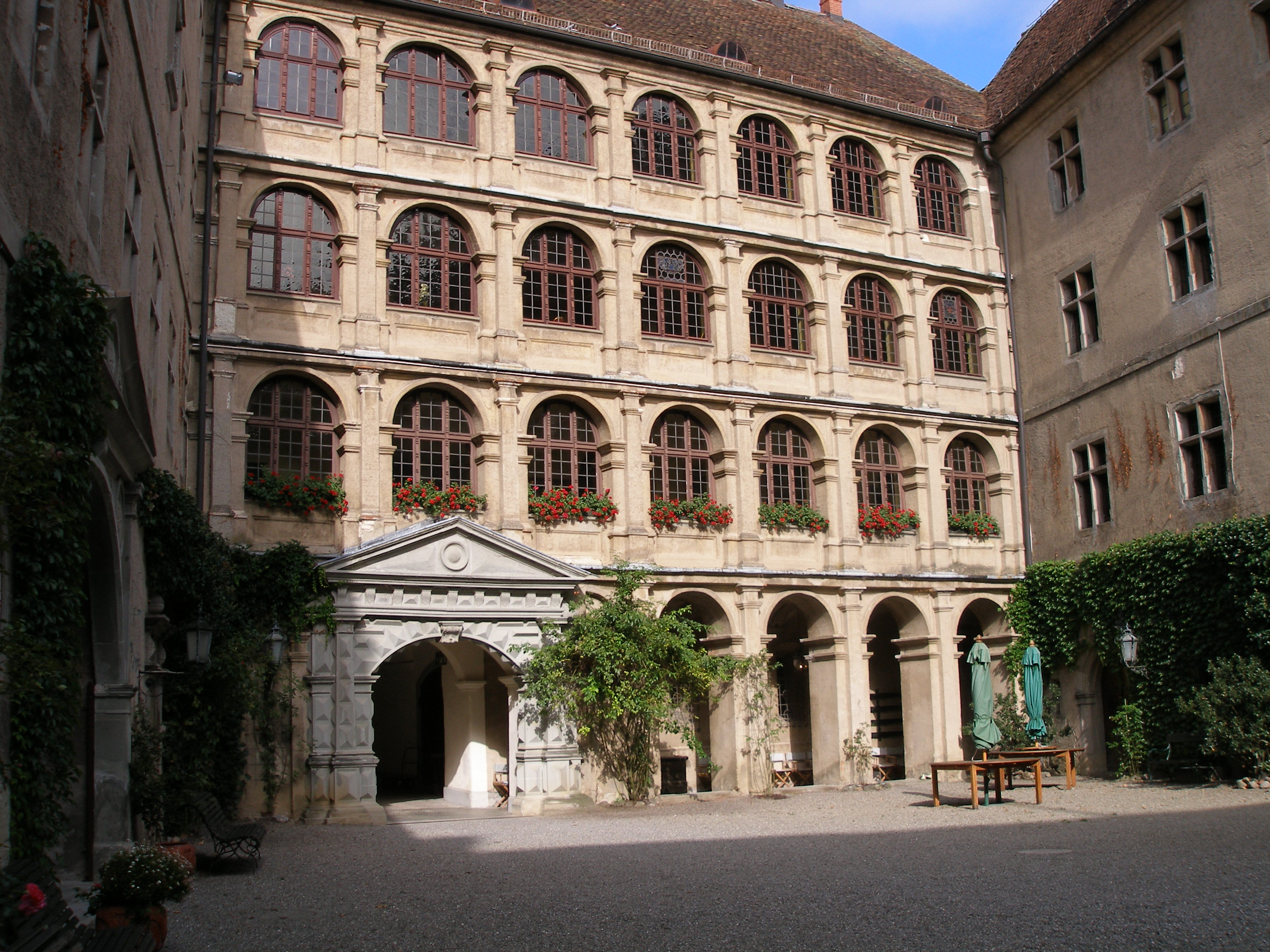
The renaissance court yard

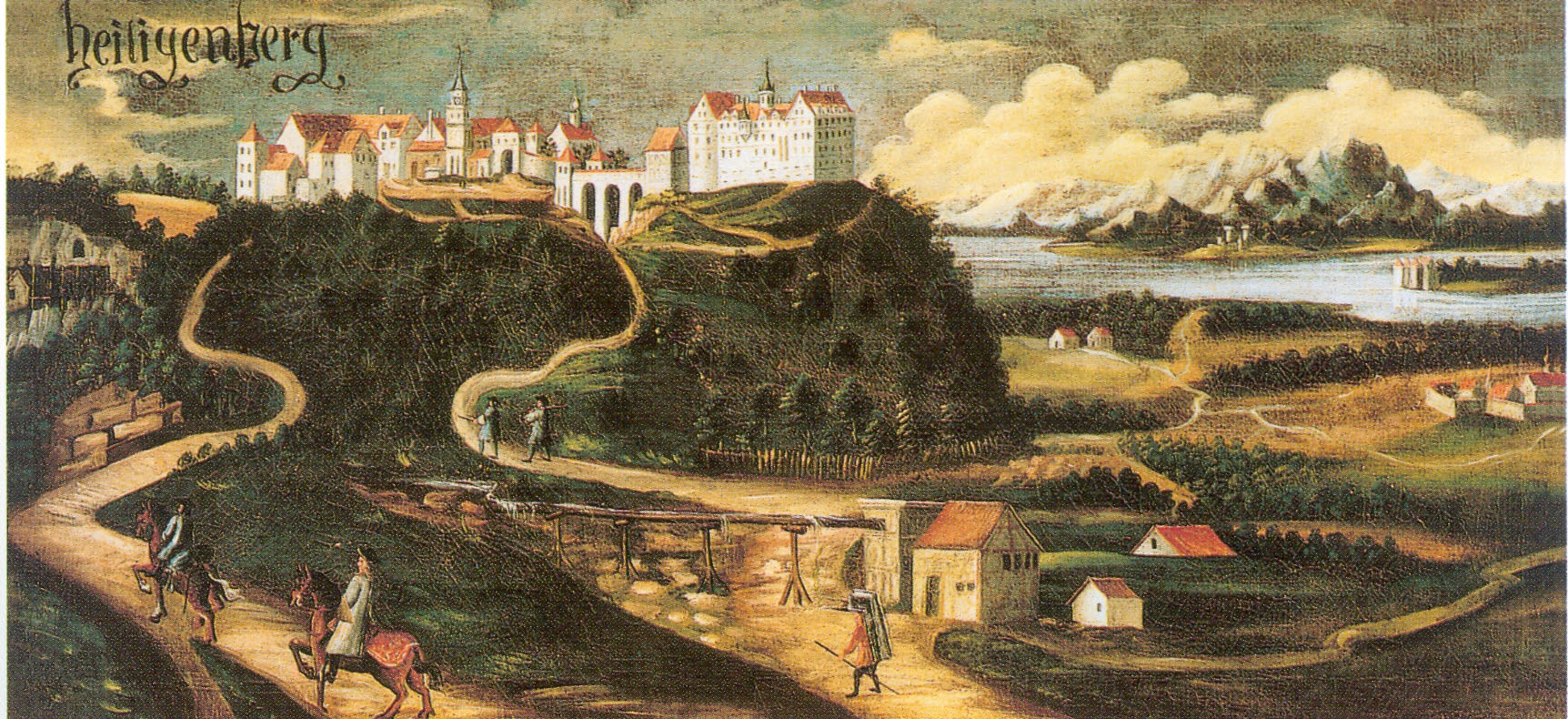
Schloss Heiligenberg around 1686

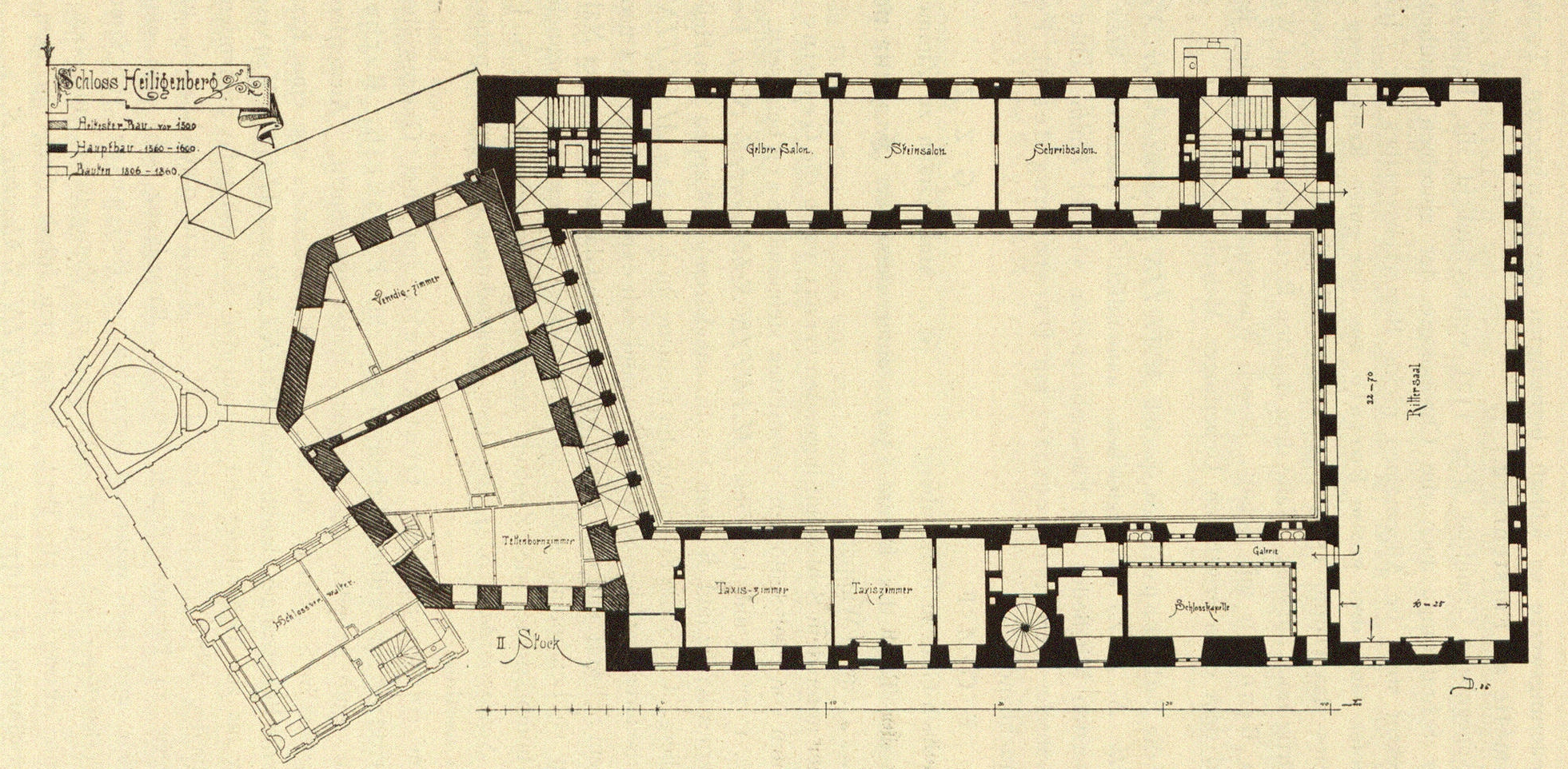
The floor plan of Schloss Heiligenberg

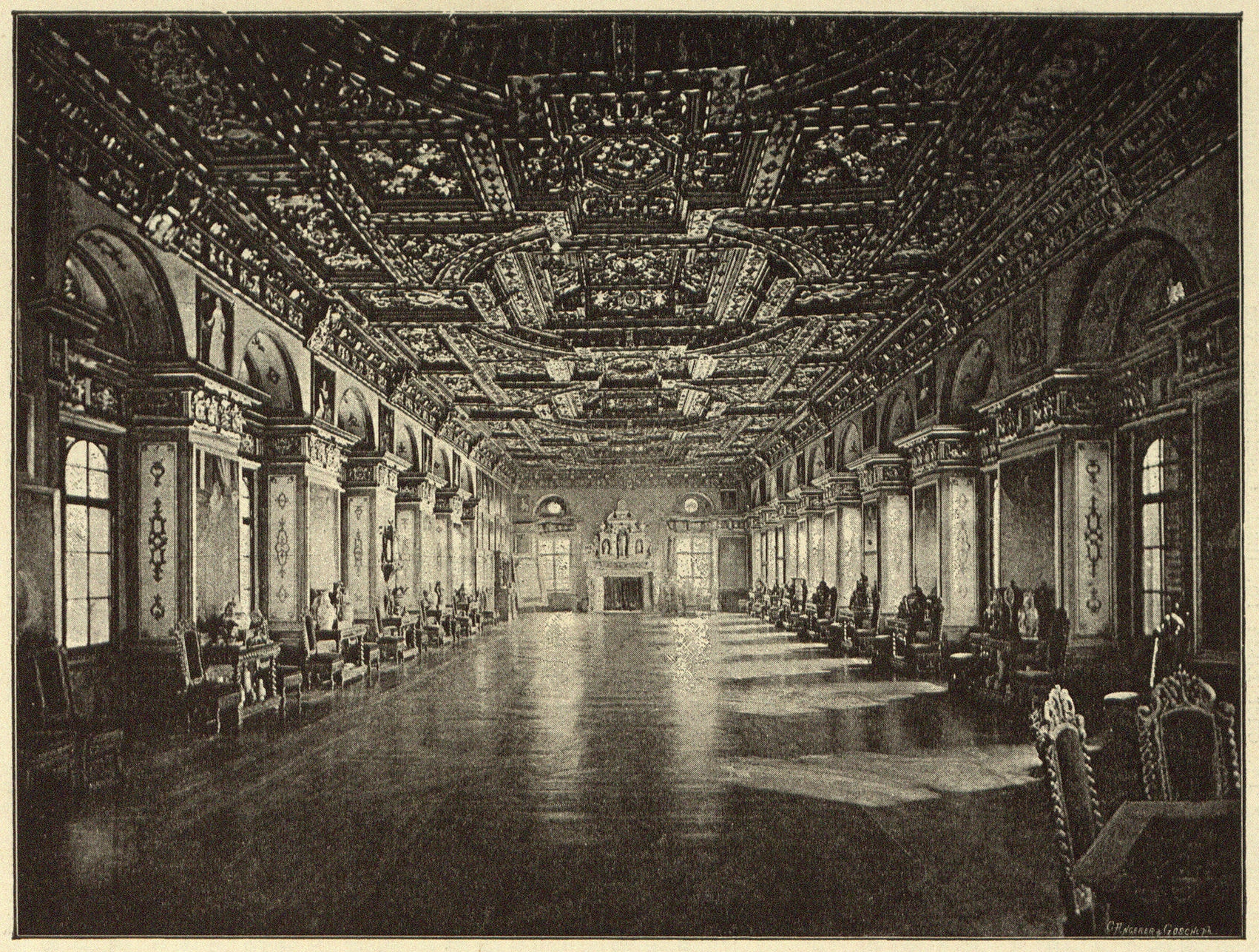
The knight's hall (‘Rittersaal’) in Schloss Heiligenberg

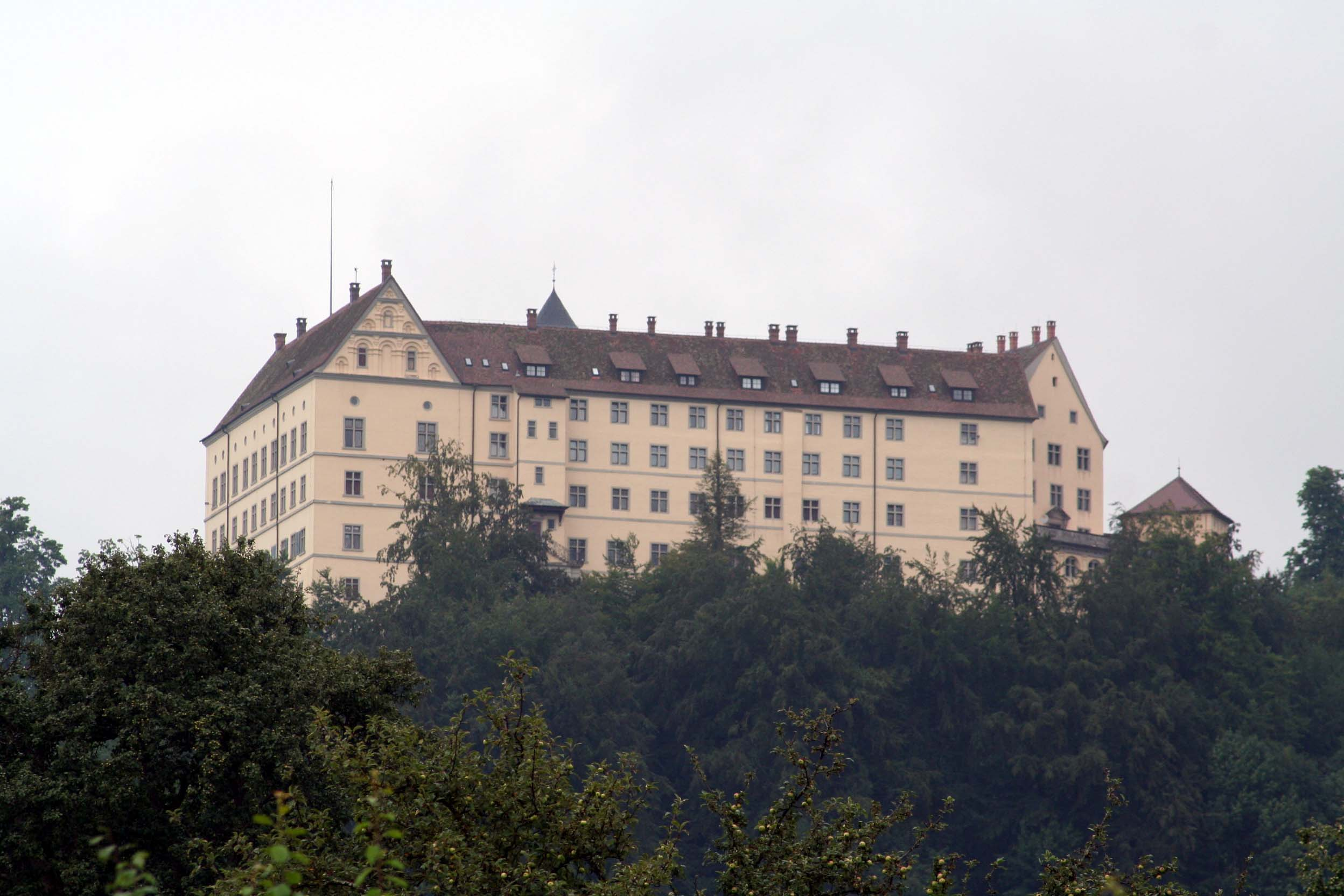
The south wing on the left and the east wing on the right

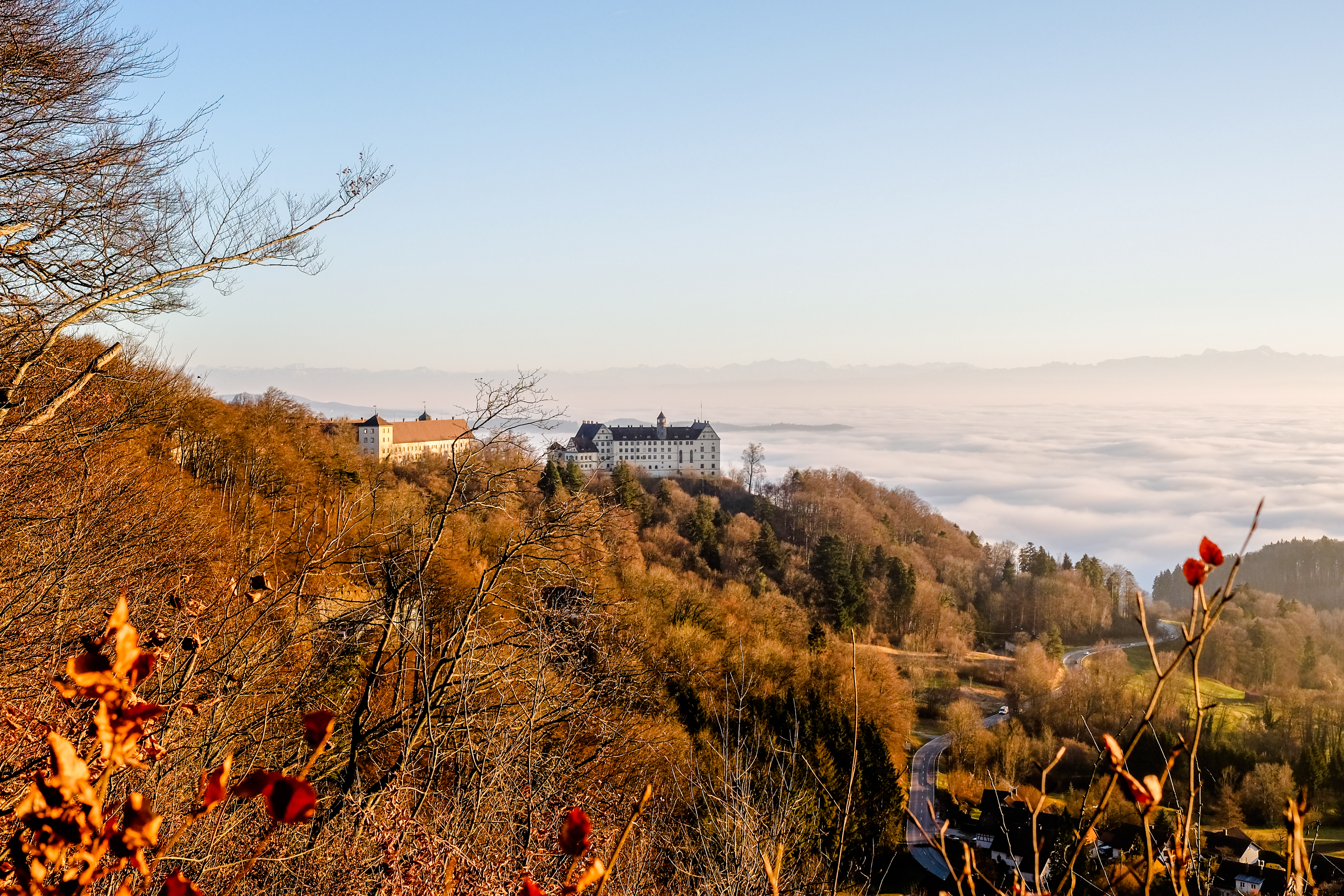
Schloss Heiligenberg overlooking Lake Constance and the Alps

Heiligenberg Castle (German: Schloss Heiligenberg) is a princely castle in renaissance style, situated in Heiligenberg, Linzgau within the state of Baden-Württemberg, Germany. It is sited on a plateau 730 metres above sea level and with views down into the Bodensee and the Alps. It contains one of the most well preserved renaissance halls north of the Alps. The castle is owned and lived in by the Fürstenberg family, and cannot be visited.

== History ==
=== Middle ages ===
The family of the counts of Heiligenberg had their origins in castle ‘Altheiligenberg’, which was located to the west of the current castle. Today, there are only some small remains of this castle in the forest. Around 1250, count Berthold von Heiligenberg constructed a new castle on the current location, which was initially named ‘Neuheiligenberg’. It was bought by count Hugo von Werdenberg in 1277. The counts of Werdenberg-Heiligenberg further enlarged and expanded the castle in the late Middle Ages, while Altheiligenberg was abandoned after 1300.

=== Renaissance ===
In 1516, countess Anna von Werdenberg (1498-1554) married count Friedrich II von Fürstenberg (1496-1559). Through this marriage, the castle passed to the House of Fürstenberg in 1535. The family owns the castle till the current day.

Shortly before he passed away, count Friedrich decided to convert the castle into a renaissance dwelling. In the 1550s, he started with demolishing most of the medieval castle, except for parts of the northern wing. His son, count Joachim (1538-1598), was responsible for most of the new work. Between 1560 and 1575, he created a four-wing complex with a beautiful renaissance court yard. The older parts of the castle were covered by a renaissance façade. These structural changes gave the castle its current Renaissance-style appearance. The work was directed by master builder Hans Schwarz.

Inside the south wing overlooking the Bodensee, the Knights' Hall (German: Rittersaal) was constructed between 1580 and 1584, one of the most magnificent ballrooms of the late German Renaissance. The room is, together with the knight's hall in Schloss Weikersheim, one of the few surviving state rooms of this time. The richly carved coffered ceiling hanging from the roof structure was created by Jörg Schwartzenberger from Meßkirch. The chimney structures on the sandstone chimneys on the narrow sides with niche and column figures were created in 1584 and probably come from Hans Morinck.

Next to the Knight's hall, there is the narrow and richly decorated castle chapel. It extends over three floors with stained glass windows from the 14th century, which originally come from the Dominican church in Konstanz. It is also considered to be a jewel of the German renaissance. Below the altar is a coffin said to contain the remains of Pope Felix I .

After 1598, Heiligenberg Castle was no longer used as a permanent residence. During the Thirty Years' War, the castle only narrowly escaped destruction. If a fuse had not failed, it would have been blown up by the retreating French crew.

The Heiligenberg branch of the House of Fürstenberg died out in 1716. The castle was inherited by another branch of the family, whose main residence was in Donaueschingen. Heiligenberg castle was only used occasionally, like from 1817 tot 1822, when princess Elisabeth zu Fürstenberg was living in the castle.

During the 19th century, various major renovations were performed to restore the knight's hall and the chapel.

=== Modern times ===
Until 2013, the Fürstenberg family used the castle as a summer residence for themselves and their guests. Hereditary Prince Christian zu Fürstenberg has lived in the palace with his family since 2013. For this aim, the east wing was renovated and turned into a liveable space. Part of the castle could be visited by the general public as part of a guided tour. Since 2022, the castle became the main residence of Christian's family. At the same moment, the decision was made that the castle would only be open to the general public on special occasions such as Open Monument Day.

== Literature ==
- Fickler, Carl Alois Borromäus (1853). Heiligenberg in Schwaben. Mit einer Geschichte seiner alten Grafen und des von ihnen beherrschten Linzgaues (in German). Karlsruhe: Macklot.
- Martin, Theodor (1883). "Schloß Heiligenberg in Schwaben". Schriften des Vereins für Geschichte des Bodensees und seiner Umgebung: 70–79.
- Martin, Theodor (1883). "Schloßcapelle in Heiligenberg". Schriften des Vereins für Geschichte des Bodensees und seiner Umgebung: 121–155.
- Berenbach, Eduard (1930). Veroneser Gäste auf Schloss Heiligenberg (in German).
- Berenbach, Eduard (1932). Die Auffindung des hl. Kreuzes und die Gründung der Burg und "Wallfahrt" Heiligenberg (in German). Überlingen: Feyl Verlagsbuchhandlung.
- Berenbach, Eduard; Barth, Franz Karl (1935). Heiligenberg: klimatischer Höhenluftkurort beim Bodensee (in German). Überlingen: Feyl Verlagsbuchhandlung.
- Berenbach, Eduard (1935). Heiligenberg beim Bodensee (in German). Überlingen: Feyl Verlagsbuchhandlung.
- Berenbach, Eduard (1936). 800 Jahre Grafen von Heiligenberg (in German). Donaueschingen: Meder.
- Berenbach, Eduard (1937). Die Fürstlich Fürstenbergische Hofkapelle in Heiligenberg (in German). Überlingen: Feyl Verlagsbuchhandlung.
- Berenbach, Eduard (1938). Heiligenberg (in German). Überlingen: Feyl Verlagsbuchhandlung.
- Berenbach, Eduard (1939). Der Meister des Rittersaales im Schlosse zu Heiligenberg (in German). Überlingen: Feyl Verlagsbuchhandlung.
- Berenbach, Eduard (1939). Das Gnadenbild von Heiligenberg (in German). Überlingen: Feyl Verlagsbuchhandlung.
- Berenbach, Eduard (1947). Die Fürstlich Fürstenbergischen Kirchenpatronate (in German).
- Alte Burgen schöne Schlösser Eine romantische Deutschlandreise (in German). Stuttgart: Verlag Das Beste. 1980. pp. 98–99. ISBN 3-87070-278-8.
- Graf zu Lynar, Ernst Wilhelm (1981). Schloss Heiligenberg (in German). München/Zürich: Schnell und Steiner. ISBN 3-7954-0830-X.
- Merten, Klaus (1987). Schlösser in Baden-Württemberg (in German). München: Verlag C.H. Beck. pp. 121–122. ISBN 3-406-32307-3.
- Feldhahn, Ulrich (2005). Schlösserreise Baden-Württemberg – ein Führer zu Burgen und Schlössern in Privatbesitz (in German). Petersberg: Michael Imhof Verlag. ISBN 3-935590-63-6.
- Beissel von Gymnich, Countess Jeannette (2007). Luxury Houses Schlösser Castles Châteaux (in German). Kempen: teNeues. pp. 168–179. ISBN 978-3-8327-9173-5.
- Krause, Susanne (2006). "Heiligenberg Schlosspark. Von der Dokumentation zur Parkpflege" (PDF). Denkmalpflege in Baden-Württemberg: 234–237.
- Losse, Michael, ed. (2012). Burgen, Schlösser, Adelssitze und Befestigungen am nördlichen Bodensee, Band 1.1: Westlicher Teil rund um Sipplingen, Überlingen, Heiligenberg und Salem (in German). Petersberg: Michael Imhof Verlag. pp. 68–77. ISBN 978-3865681911.
