= Hugues de Lionne =

French statesman (1611–1671)

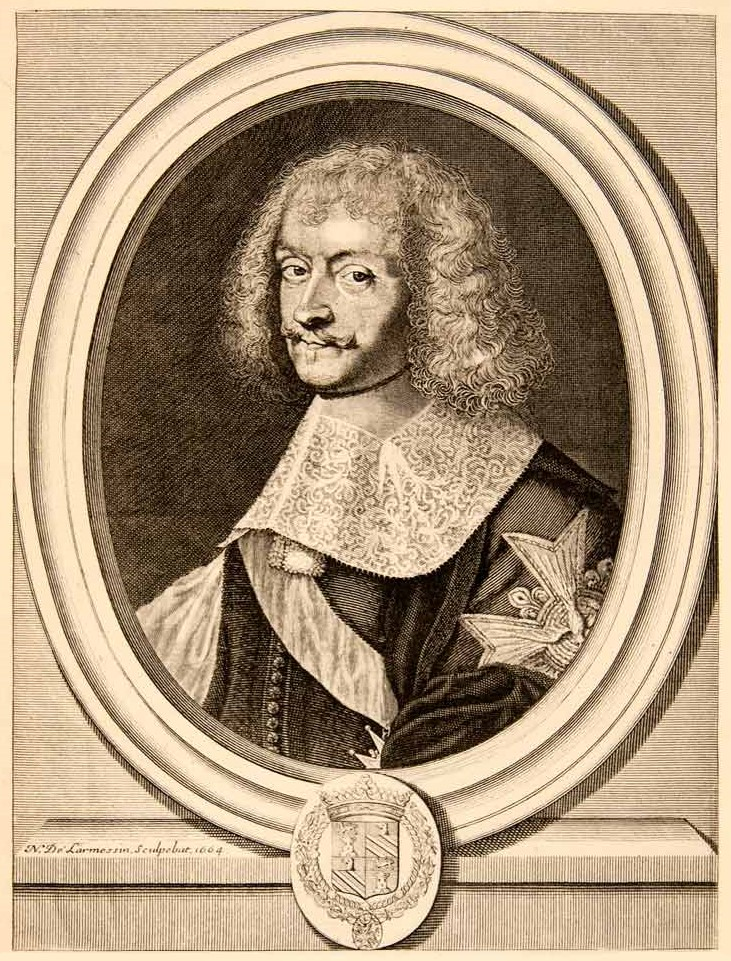
- Born: Hugues de Lionne; 11 October 1611; Grenoble
- Died: 1 September 1671 (aged 59); Paris

Hugues de Lionne (11 October 1611 – 1 September 1671) was a French statesman.

He was born in Grenoble, of an old family of Dauphiné. Early trained for diplomacy, he fell into disgrace under Cardinal Richelieu, but his remarkable abilities attracted the notice of Cardinal Mazarin, who sent him as secretary of the French embassy to the congress of Munster, and, in 1642, on a mission to the pope.

In 1646, he became secretary to the queen regent Anne of Austria. In 1653, he obtained high office in the kings household and in 1654, he was ambassador extraordinary at the election of Pope Alexander VII.

On the death of Ferdinand III, Hugues co-led the French effort to select an Emperor outside the Habsburg family. He and the Cardinal cultivated relationships with German nobility, including Franz Egon of Fürstenberg, prime minister of Cologne, and his brother Wilhelm. With their help, Hugues was instrumental in forming the league of the Rhine, by which Austria was cut off from the Spanish Netherlands, and, as minister of state, was associated with Mazarin in the Treaty of the Pyrenees (1659), which secured the marriage of Louis XIV to the infanta Maria Theresa of Spain.

At the cardinals dying request he was appointed his successor in foreign affairs, a position he held from 3 April 1663 to 1 September 1671. Among his most important diplomatic successes were the Treaty of Breda (1667), the Treaty of Aix-la-Chapelle (1668) and the Sale of Dunkirk.

He died in Paris in 1671, leaving memoirs. His friend Arnauld de Pomponne replaced him as secretary of State.

He was a man of pleasure, but his natural indolence gave place to an unflagging energy when the occasion demanded it; and, in an age of great ministers, his consummate statesmanship placed him in the front rank.

One of his sons, Artus de Lionne, became a missionary of the Paris Foreign Missions Society, and was active in Siam (modern Thailand) and China.

== Bibliography ==
- Ulysse Chevalier, Lettres inédites de Hugues de Lionne précédées d'une notice historique sur la famille de Lionne (Valence, 1879)
- O'Connor, John T. (1978). Negotiator out of Season. Athens, GA: University of Georgia Press. ISBN 0-8203-0436-0.
- Adolphe Rochas, Biographie du Dauphiné (Paris, 1860), tome ii. p. 87.
- Jules Valfrey, La diplomatie française au XVII^{e} siècle: Hugues de Lionne, ses ambassadeurs (2 vols., Paris, 1877–1881)
