= Romance of the Three Kingdoms (disambiguation) =

Romance of the Three Kingdoms is a novel written by Luo Guanzhong.

Romance of the Three Kingdoms may also refer to:

- Romance of the Three Kingdoms (video game series), computer/video game series by Koei
- Romance of the Three Kingdoms (TV series), 1994 CCTV television series
- Three Kingdoms (TV series), 2010 TV series, directed by Gao Xixi
- San Guo Zhi (manhua), by Lee Chi Ching
- Romance of the Three Kingdoms (2009 animation), Chinese-Japanese joint product animation

== See also ==
- Records of the Three Kingdoms (disambiguation)
- Three Kingdoms (disambiguation)
