= Tre kronor =

Tre kronor, Swedish "Three crowns", may refer to:

- Three Crowns, a national emblem of Sweden
- Sweden men's national ice hockey team, which has the Swedish national emblem on its jersey
- Tre Kronor (castle), a 16th-century royal castle in Stockholm, Sweden
- HSwMS Tre Kronor, a Swedish Navy ship
- Tre kronor (TV series)

== See also ==
- Three crowns (disambiguation)
