= Frederick IV of Fürstenberg =

Frederick IV
- Count of Fürstenberg-Heiligenberg
- Predecessor: Joachim, Count of Fürstenberg
- Successor: Egon VIII of Fürstenberg-Heiligenberg
- Born: Friederich von Fürstenberg-Heiligenberg; 9 May 1563
- Died: 8 August 1617 (aged 54); Dresden, Saxony
- Noble family: Fürstenberg-Heiligenberg
- Spouses: Elisabeth of Sulz; Maria of Arco
- Issue: Egon VIII, Count of Fürstenberg-Heiligenberg
- Father: Joachim, Count of Fürstenberg
- Mother: Anna of Zimmern

Frederick IV of Fürstenberg-Heiligenberg (German: Friederich von Fürstenberg-Heiligenberg; 9 May 1563 – 8 August 1617), a member of the Swabian noble house of Fürstenberg, was Count (Graf) of Fürstenberg-Heiligenberg, today a part of Baden-Württemberg, Germany. He was the son of Count Joachim of Fürstenberg (1538–1598) and his wife, Countess Anna of Zimmern.

== Marriage and children ==
On 10 September 1584, he married Countess Elisabeth of Sulz. Together, they had the following children:

- William (1586-1618), married Baroness Polyxena Anna Benigna Popel of Lobkowicz
- Joachim Alwig (1587-1617)
- Ernst Egon VIII (1588-1635), married Anna Maria, daughter of Prince John George of Hohenzollern-Hechingen
- Jacob Louis of Fürstenberg-Wartenberg (1592-1627), married Helena Eleonora of Schwendi
- Anna Barbara (1594-1597)
- Elizabeth (1595-1602)
- Maria Johanna (1597)

Elisabeth died in 1601, and in 1606, Frederick married Maria of Arco, the widow of Wolfgang Rumpf vom Wullroß at Weitra, chamberlain of Emperor Rudolf II. She died however only one year later. The comital title was inherited by Frederick's surviving son Ernst Egon.
