= Wilhelm Egon von Fürstenberg =

German count, prince and clergyman (1629–1704)

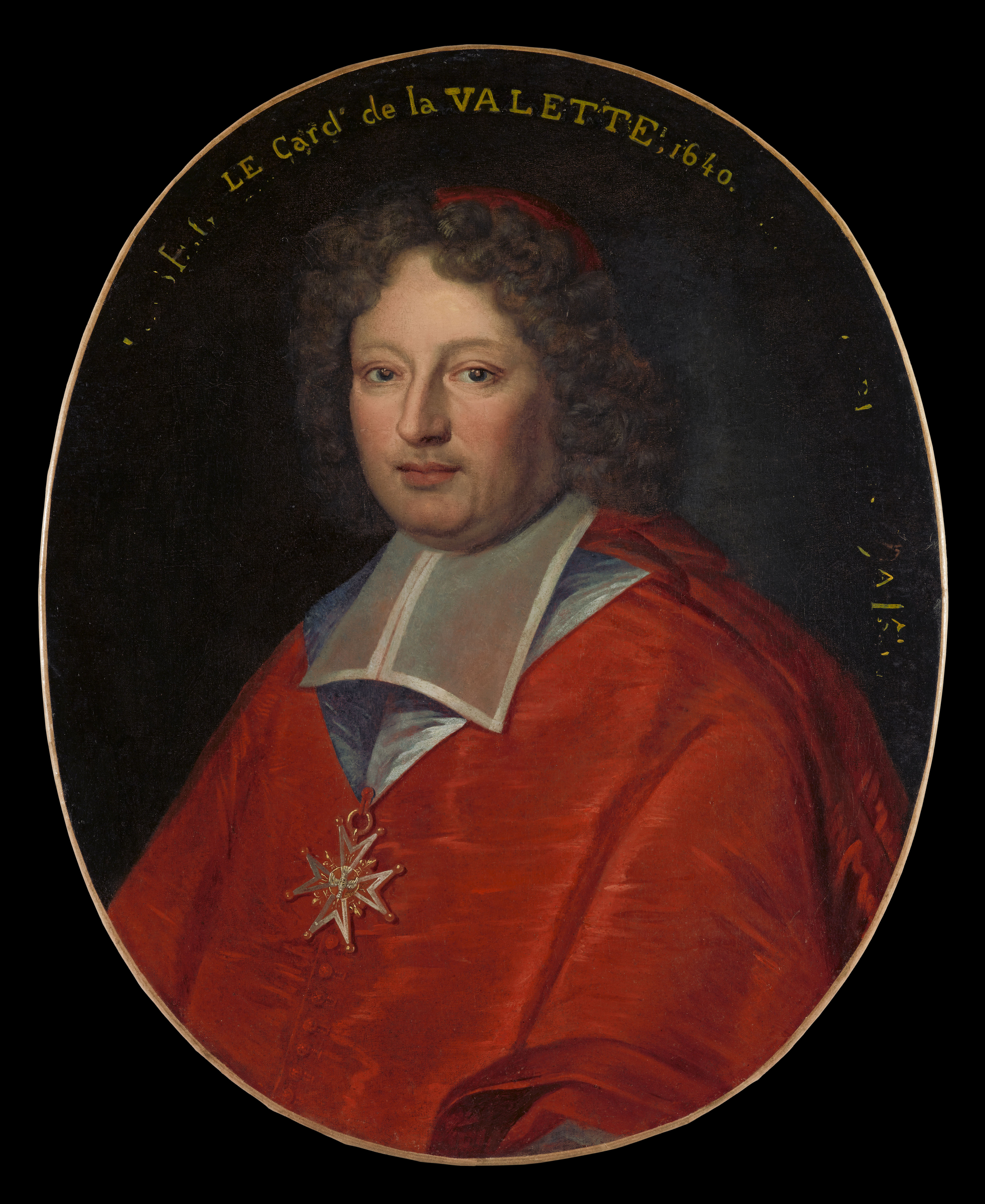
- Portrait of Wilhelm Egon von Fürstenberg
- Born: 2 December 1629
- Died: 10 April 1704 (aged 74); Paris, Kingdom of France
- Noble family: Fürstenberg
- Father: Egon VIII von Fürstenberg-Heiligenberg
- Mother: Anna Maria of Hohenzollern-Hechingen

Wilhelm Egon von Fürstenberg-Heiligenberg (2 December 1629 – 10 April 1704) was a German count and later prince of Fürstenberg-Heiligenberg in the Holy Roman Empire. He was a clergyman who became bishop of Strasbourg, and was heavily involved in European politics after the Thirty Years' War. He worked for the Archbishop-Elector of Cologne and Louis XIV of France at the same time, and was arrested and tried for treason for convincing the Elector to fight on the opposite side of a war from the Empire.

== Early life ==
Wilhelm was a younger son of Egon VIII of Fürstenberg-Heiligenberg and Anna Maria of Hohenzollern-Hechingen. His father died in the Thirty Years' War in 1635, when Wilhelm was young. Starting in 1637, Wilhelm attended the Dreikönigsgymnasium Gymnasium with his elder brother, Franz Egon. There they met Maximilian Heinrich of Bavaria and formed friendships that would shape all their careers. Wilhelm then went on to study in Leuven in 1643, and after that to study theology in Rome in 1646, where he was presented to Pope Innocent X.

== Career ==
Coat of arms of Wilhelm Egon von Fürstenberg as Prince-Bishop of Strasbourg

In 1648, Wilhelm was made subdeacon in the cathedral chapter at Cologne, and the following year joined Franz as a member of the Archbishop-Elector's privy council. In 1650, when their friend Maximilian inherited the role of Archbishop-Elector, Wilhelm and Franz gained significant influence in the court. In 1651, Cardinal Mazarin stayed in Cologne as a safe haven during the Fronde. During that time, he got to know Franz and Wilhelm, and to see the influence they had in Cologne and other lands within the Empire. He began to cultivate them as supporters of French aims within the Empire, supporting their interest in developing Rhineland defensive alliances. In 1656, the Cardinal gave Wilhelm control of the Abbey of St. Michel en Thiérache near Soissons.

=== Impact in the empire ===
When Ferdinand III, Holy Roman Emperor, died in 1657, Mazarin asked Wilhelm to help him influence the selection of the next Emperor, even going so far as to suggest Louis XIV of France for the role. Maximilian and the Electors of Mainz and Trier sent Wilhelm to Ferdinand Maria, Elector of Bavaria, to see if he would be willing to be put forth as the next Emperor, but he declined. Wilhelm also reported this result in person to the Cardinal and Louis XIV, and let them know that the French king did not have a reasonable chance with the electors. At this meeting, the Cardinal began negotiating with Wilhelm the fees and titles for him and his brother if they worked for French interests. The Cardinal instructed his lead negotiator in the Empire, Hugues de Lionne, to continue negotiating with the brothers for their support, indicating that the king would pay them eighteen thousand livres for ongoing dedicated work, regardless of the result of the election of the Emperor. Wilhelm insisted on a document spelling out the benefits offered, as he was concerned the French might leave him out to dry after he showed himself too strongly opposed to the Habsburgs. On 4 June 1658, Lionne, Franz, and Wilhelm signed an agreement detailing French support for the counts should they continue to work "for all the plans and interests of His Majesty in Germany".

Following the coronation of Leopold I, Wilhelm and Franz contributed significantly to the establishment of the League of the Rhine in August 1658. This was supported and joined by the French as a further check against the new Habsburg Emperor. The Habsburgs tried to offer the brothers prizes and titles if they would halt the League's formation, but they refused.

=== International negotiations ===
In 1659, Cardinal Mazarin asked Maximilian and Johann Philipp von Schönborn, the Elector of Mainz, to oversee negotiations to end the Franco-Spanish War. Maximilian thereafter sent Wilhelm regularly to the French court, to negotiations and ultimately to the signing of the Treaty of the Pyrenees. In 1661, Wilhelm spent months in Paris conveying the suit of Charles IV, Duke of Lorraine, who wished to marry Anne Marie Louise d'Orléans, Duchess of Montpensier. While she rejected the offer, she did enjoy spending time with Wilhelm, admiring his intelligence and his knowledge of foreign affairs. In 1664, Leopold elevated the territory of Fürstenberg-Heligenberg from a county to a principality, and also extended the title of Prince to Franz and Wilhelm, though their brother ruled the territory. This was done to try to draw the brothers closer to Habsburg Austria, but did not appear to change much. As the representative from Cologne, Wilhelm drove the negotiations in 1665 and 1666 to end the involvement of Bernhard von Galen, the Bishop of Münster, in the Second Anglo-Dutch War so that they would not overly restrict the authority of the Bishop of Münster to wage war in the future.

When Philip IV of Spain died in 1665, the great powers wondered how long his heir, the sickly Charles II, would last. Wilhelm was put to work by France to begin negotiations related to the succession in Spain and in the Spanish Netherlands. In the run up to the War of Devolution, Wilhelm carried funds to Maximilian to fund the build-up of an army for Cologne. He also visited the Count Palatine of Neuburg, Philip Wilhelm, and the Elector of Bavaria to persuade them not to allow Austrian forces to move through their lands to oppose French maneuvers in the Netherlands. On 8 January 1667, Wilhelm went to Vienna representing Cologne (but acting on behalf of France) to sound out the Emperor's feelings about the succession, perhaps splitting the Netherlands from Spain after the death of Charles. There he spent much time establishing relationships with various ministers at the court. He was offered titles and money to join the Habsburg side and work for the end of the League of the Rhine, but he demurred. He was also sought by Petar Zrinski, who wished his help (and thus French help) in a Hungarian revolution. Wilhelm avoided being seen too often with him. However, he did let Louis XIV know of the Hungarian revolutionaries, and their potential to provide an opportune diversion for Austrian forces. This laid the ground for a 1668 treaty between France and Austria agreeing that if Charles died without an heir, France would receive the Spanish Netherlands, the County of Burgundy, Navarre, the Philippines, the Two Sicilies, and Morocco, while the remaining Spanish territories would go to Austria.

In early 1668, Wilhelm was negotiating with Grand Pensionary Johan de Witt to try to come to an arrangement in the War of Devolution to partition the Spanish Netherlands between France and the Dutch Republic.

Early in 1669, he spent a month training with his French regiment in Lille. He had been appointed colonel of this regiment shortly before. This appointment made it even harder for others to believe he was not working directly for Louis XIV. However, Wilhelm was not above taking advantage of the French for personal gain. That July, he had his brother, Hermann Egon, arrange a meeting so that it would appear the Dutch were negotiating trade agreements with the League of the Rhine against France. This was done so that the French would give the brothers money that they would then use to purchase Mainau.

Wilhelm was instrumental in the preparations for the Franco-Dutch War. He went between France and numerous rulers in the Empire to try to build an unbeatable alliance for the attack on the Dutch. In 1670 he secured French support for the army of Cologne, guaranteeing the interests of Maximilian in the treaty. He then went to convince Frederick William, Elector of Brandenburg, to join the offensive alliance, though he was ultimately unsuccessful. By July 1671, Wilhelm convinced the Bishop of Münster to join the French alliance.

=== Downfall and rescue ===
During the negotiations in 1666 with Münster in the Second Anglo-Dutch War, Wilhelm found himself opposed by the Elector of Brandenburg. In 1670, while attempting to get Brandenburg to join the French alliance in the Franco-Dutch War, Wilhelm also asked the elector about his opinion of a successor for Leopold I, who was sick at the time. Wilhelm suggested again Louis XIV as the next Emperor, but Brandenburg preferred the Duke of Neuburg. When Wilhelm went to leave, he was delayed by the disappearance of some of his baggage, which included his money and diplomatic papers. The bags turned up the next day without the money, so Wilhelm considered it simple theft. He did not notice that his papers had been searched, and that the document detailing his discussions and plans for the Emperor's replacement was missing. This document would show up again as evidence of his treason against the Emperor at his trial. In 1671, the Elector of Brandenburg spoke many times to Leopold against the influence that Wilhelm was wielding on behalf of France, and the Emperor became more strongly opposed to Wilhelm's work.

In 1672 the Emperor joined the Franco-Dutch War as an ally of the Dutch, finding himself opposed by several bishops in the northwest part of the Empire. The Fürstenberg brothers being regarded by the Imperialists as the main cause of this disaster, Wilhelm was arrested for treason on 14 February 1674 by imperial cavalry after chasing his carriage through Cologne. At the time of his arrest he was making ninety thousand livres a year from France. He was hurried off to Vienna and was tried for his life. He was saved by the intervention of the papal nuncio at Cologne, but was kept in prison until the signature of the Treaty of Nijmwegen in 1679.

As a reward for his services Louis XIV appointed him bishop of Strassburg in succession to his brother in 1682, in 1683 obtained for him from Pope Innocent XI the cardinal's hat, and in 1688 succeeded in obtaining his election as coadjutor-archbishop of Cologne and successor to Maximilian. At the instance of the emperor, however, the pope interposed his veto on 26 August 1688; the canons followed the papal lead. Louis XIV attacked the Empire, citing this action as well as his sister-in-law's claim to the inheritance of the Palatinate as his pretexts. As the progress of the Allies against Louis XIV in the Nine Years War deprived him of all prospect of success, Wilhelm Egon retired to France. He retired to his abbey of St-Germain-des-Prés near Paris, where he died on 10 April 1704.

== Personal life ==
While in Brandenburg in 1670, Wilhelm met the twenty-two-year-old Katharine Charlotte von Wallenrodt. She was the daughter of a Saxon general, and married to Count Anton von Schleiden und Lumain. They began a love affair, and many contemporaries considered Wilhelm the father of her son born in 1674. Upon the death of her husband in 1680, Wilhelm took over as guardian for her three sons. In 1685 she married Wilhelm's nephew, Emmanuel Franz Egon. She travelled with Wilhelm to his exile in France in 1689, and remained with him until his death.

== Bibliography ==
- Montpensier, Anne Marie Louise (1857). "Mêmoires de Mademoiselle de Montpensier". In Michaud; Poujoulat (eds.). Nouvelle Collection des Mêmoires relatifs à l'Histoire de France. Vol. 28. Paris.
- O'Connor, John T. (1978). Negotiator out of Season. Athens, GA: University of Georgia Press. ISBN 0-8203-0436-0.
- Pagès, Georges (1933). "Comment Guillaume de Fürstenberg entra au service de Louis XIV". Mélanges offerts à Nicolas Jorga. Paris: 727–737.

Catholic Church titles
Preceded by Franz Egon von Fürstenberg-Heiligenberg	Bishop of Strasbourg; 1682–1704	Succeeded by Armand Gaston Maximilien de Rohan
