= Dreikönigsgymnasium =

Oldest secondary school in Cologne, Germany

Coordinates: 50.967°N 6.929°E

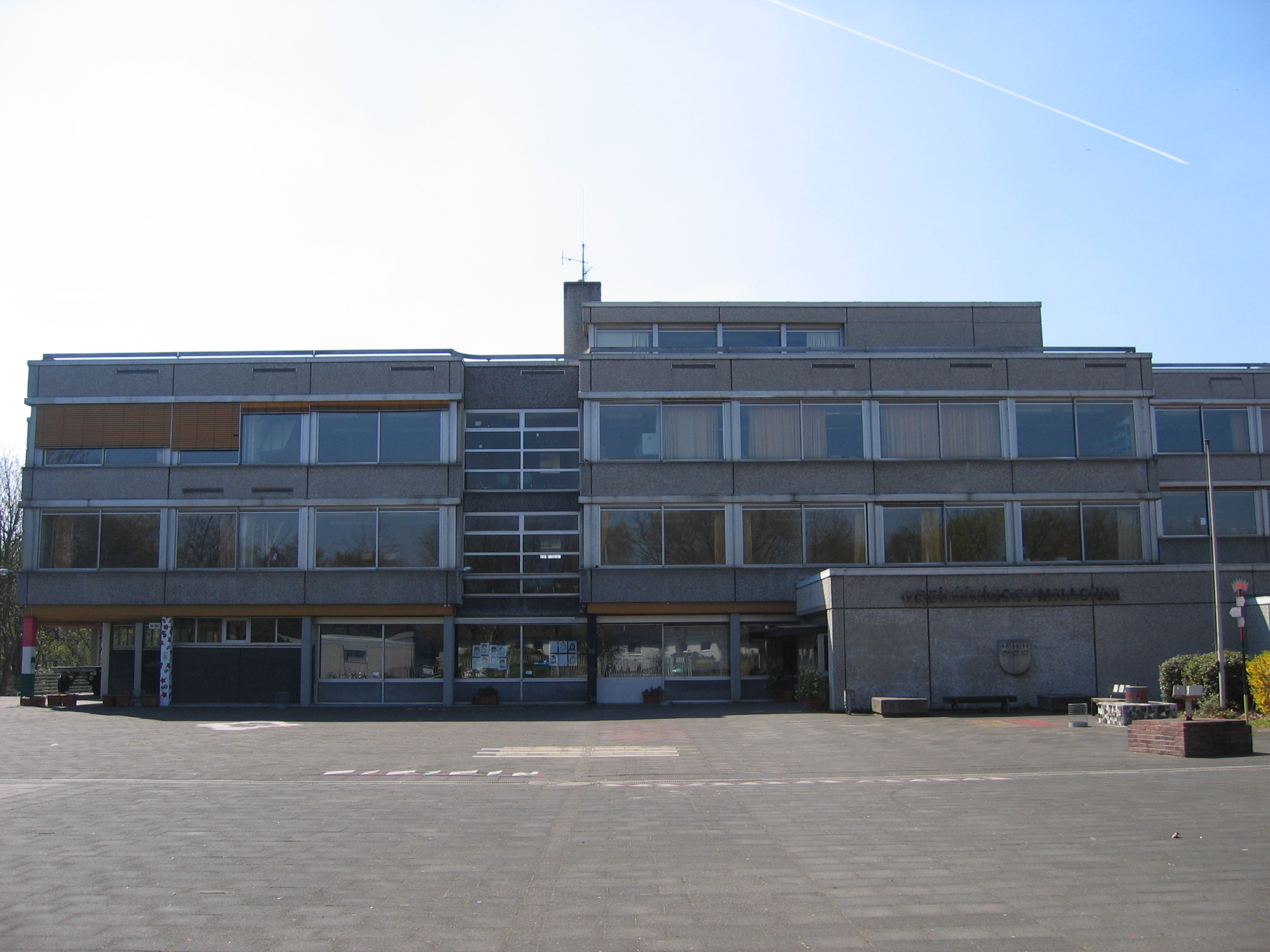
- Type: Gymnasium
- Established: 1450; 576 years ago
- Location: Cologne, Germany
- Website: www.dkg-koeln.de

The Dreikönigsgymnasium ("Tricoronatum", meaning "Three Kings School", sometimes referred to in English as the College of the Three Crowns) is a regular public Gymnasium located in Cologne, Germany. Founded in 1450 by the city of Cologne, it is the oldest school in Cologne and one of the oldest in Germany. In 1556 it was transferred to Jesuit control through the son of the mayor, who had become a Jesuit. The Jesuits continued to run the school until 1778, when control was restored to the city after the papal suppression of the Jesuits of 1773.

== Notable alumni ==
- Julius Echter von Mespelbrunn (1545–1617) was a Prince-Bishop of Würzburg
- Dietrich von Fürstenberg (1546–1618), Prince-Bishop of the Roman Catholic Diocese of Paderborn
- Erycius PUTEANUS (1574-1646), Historiographe - Professor consilliarus - Venlo
- Johann Adam Schall von Bell (1592–1666), Jesuit missionary to China
- Maximilian Henry of Bavaria (1621-1688), Archbishop-Elector of Cologne
- Franz Egon of Fürstenberg (1626–1682), Imperial Count
- Wilhelm Egon von Fürstenberg (1629–1704), prince of Fürstenberg-Heiligenberg
- Theodor Schwann (1810–1882), physiologist
- Adolph Kolping (1813–1865), Catholic priest
- Carl Schurz (1829–1906), German revolutionary, American statesman and reformer, and Union Army general
- Wilhelm Marx (1863–1946), Chancellor of Germany during the Weimar Republic
- Fritz Schramma (1947-2026), Mayor of Cologne
- Peter Kohlgraf (born 1967), Bishop of Mainz
- Daniel Brühl (born 1978), Actor

== Notable faculty ==
- Francis Coster (1532–1619), Jesuit theologian
- Georg Ohm (1789–1854), Physicist
- Justus Velsius
- Friedrich von Spee (1591–1635), Jesuit, poet and opponent of Witch trials
- Peter Wust (1884–1940), Philosopher
