= League of the Rhine =

Defensive union (1658)

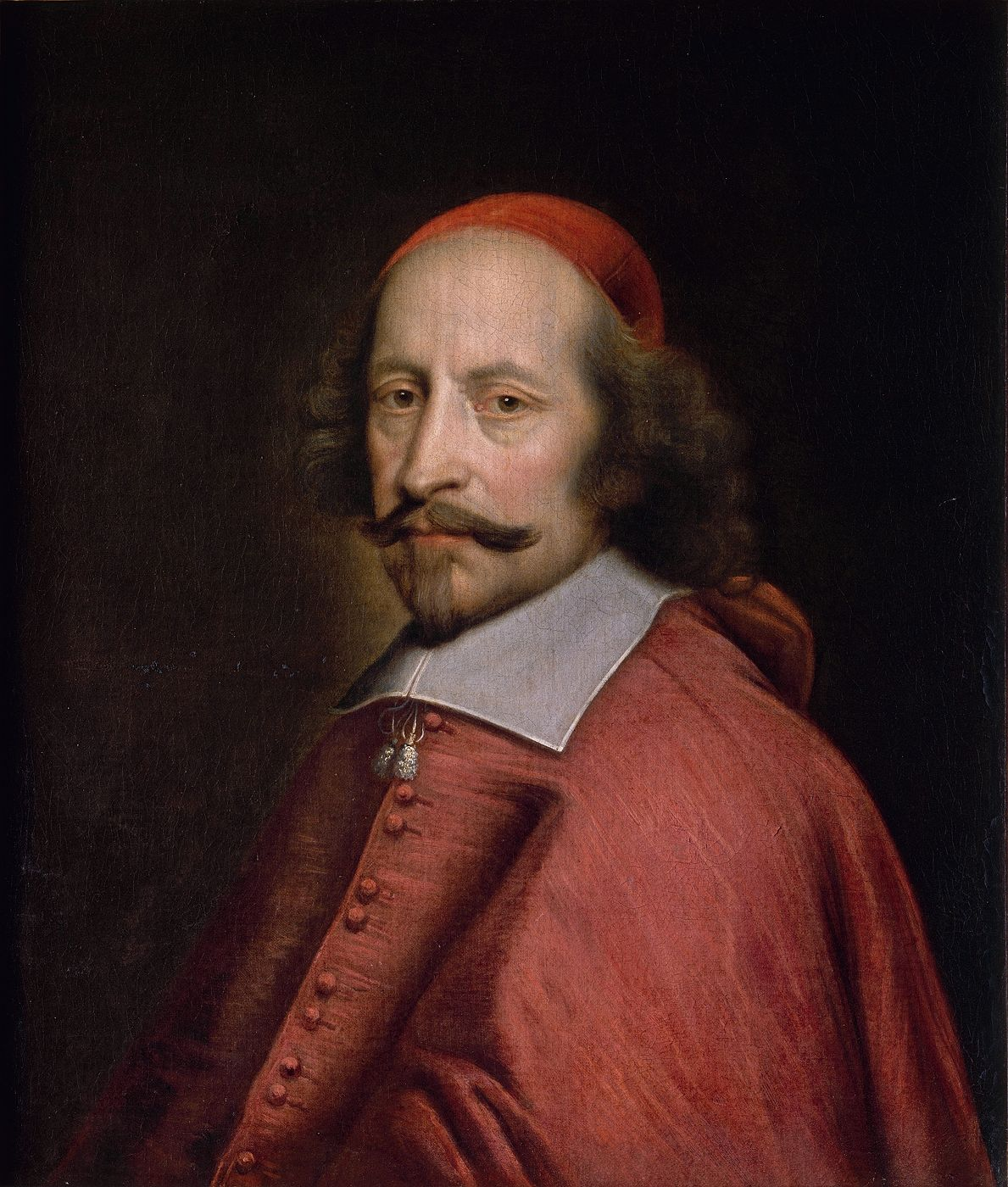
Cardinal Mazarin

The League of the Rhine (also known as the Erster Rheinbund, First Rhine-Bund; or the Rheinische Allianz – Rhenish Alliance) was a defensive union of more than 50 German princes and their cities along the River Rhine, formed on 14 August 1658 by Louis XIV of France and negotiated by Cardinal Mazarin (the de facto prime minister of France), Hugues de Lionne and Johann Philipp von Schönborn (Elector of Mainz and Archchancellor of the Empire).

== Aims ==
Its intended aim was to weaken the position of the Holy Roman Emperor, Leopold I and to marginalise the Austrian House of Habsburg. Louis XIV had wished to be elected emperor himself, but had failed, despite the French victory at the Battle of the Dunes. The new confederation allied itself to France, swearing not to let any anti-French troops (marching to attack France in the Spanish Netherlands or elsewhere) pass through their territory, thus protecting France's eastern frontier with a "military border" running along the Rhine and cutting Habsburg monarchy off from the Spanish Netherlands.

Sweden was guaranteed its German possessions in Bremen-Verden, and later also those in Swedish Pomerania. The League's members also swore to maintain the clauses of the 1648 Treaty of Westphalia, which had made the League possible by authorising the German princes, immediate vassals of the Emperor, to conclude alliances between themselves or with foreign states.

== Existence and legacy ==
On August 14, 1658, the League of the Rhine was formed by:

- Karl Kaspar von der Leyen, Archbishop Elector of Trier
- Johann Philipp von Schönborn, Archbishop Elector of Mainz
- Maximilian Henry, Archbishop Elector of Cologne
- Bernhard von Galen, Prince-bishop of Münster
- Philip William, Duke of Palatinate-Neuburg
- Ferdinand Maria, Elector of Bavaria
- Wilhelm VI, Landgrave of Hesse-Kassel
- Augustus the Younger, Duke of Brunswick-Lüneburg
- Charles X, King of Sweden

The League fielded a force of 6000 to fight on the side of France and the Empire against the Ottomans, seeing action in the 1664 Battle of Saint Gotthard.

The League was promulgated to last for three years, which was later twice extended. It officially ended in August 1667, but its end should in fact be dated to 1668 since French diplomacy succeeded in negotiating a further extension of the alliance as the Rheinbundrat, made up only of the main members of the League, which lasted to 1688.
