= Maximilian Henry of Bavaria =

German Catholic archbishop (1621–1688)

- Archbishop of Cologne
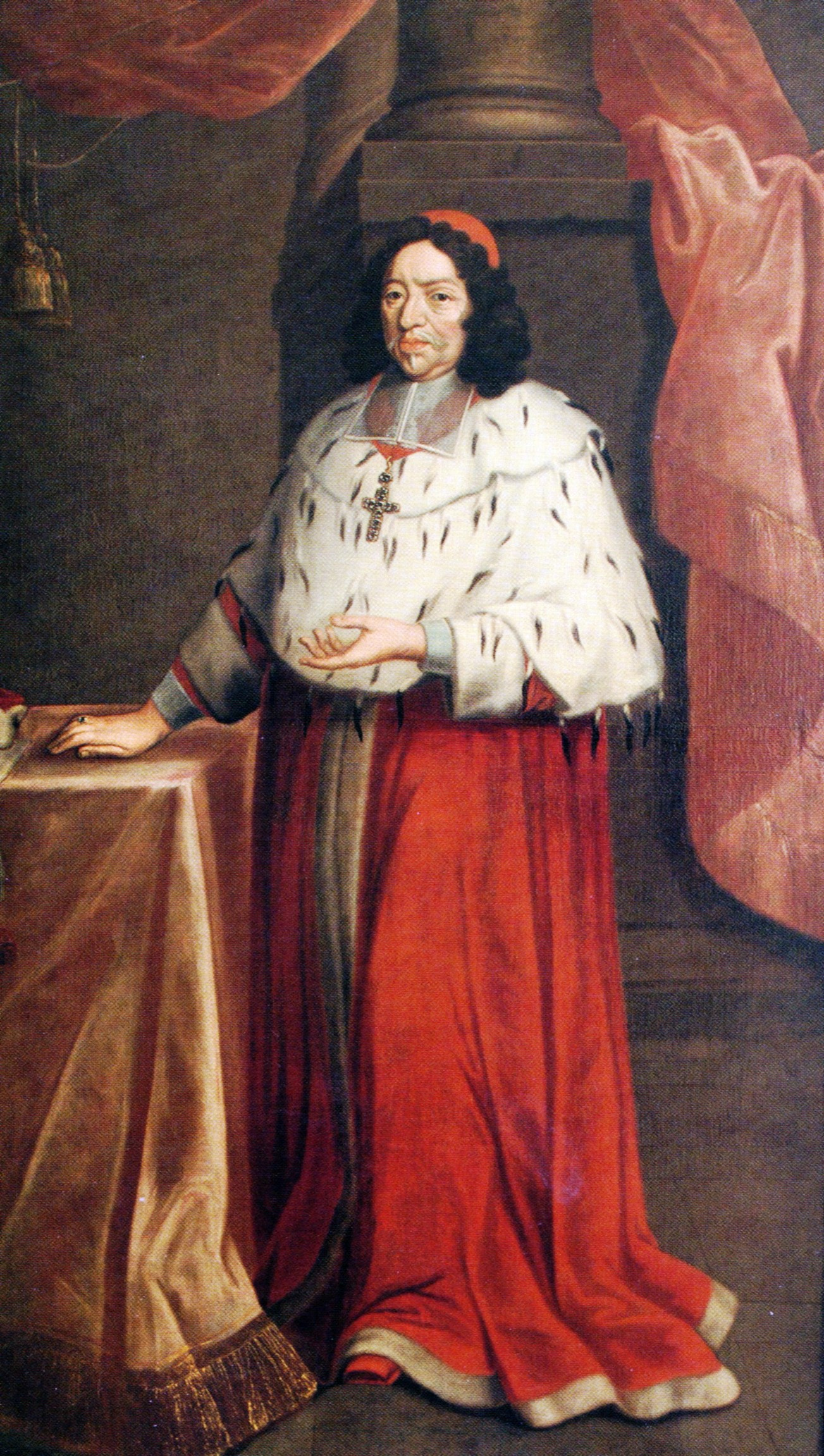
- Church: Roman Catholic Church
- Archdiocese: Cologne
- See: Cologne
- Appointed: 1650
- Term ended: 1688
- Predecessor: Ferdinand of Bavaria
- Successor: Joseph Clemens of Bavaria
- Other posts: Prince-Bishop of Liege (1650–1688); Prince-Bishop of Münster (1683–1688)

Orders
- Ordination: 8 October 1651
- Consecration: 29 October 1651 by Fabio Chigi

Personal details
- Born: 8 October 1621 Munich, Duchy of Bavaria, Holy Roman Empire
- Died: 3 June 1688 (aged 66)

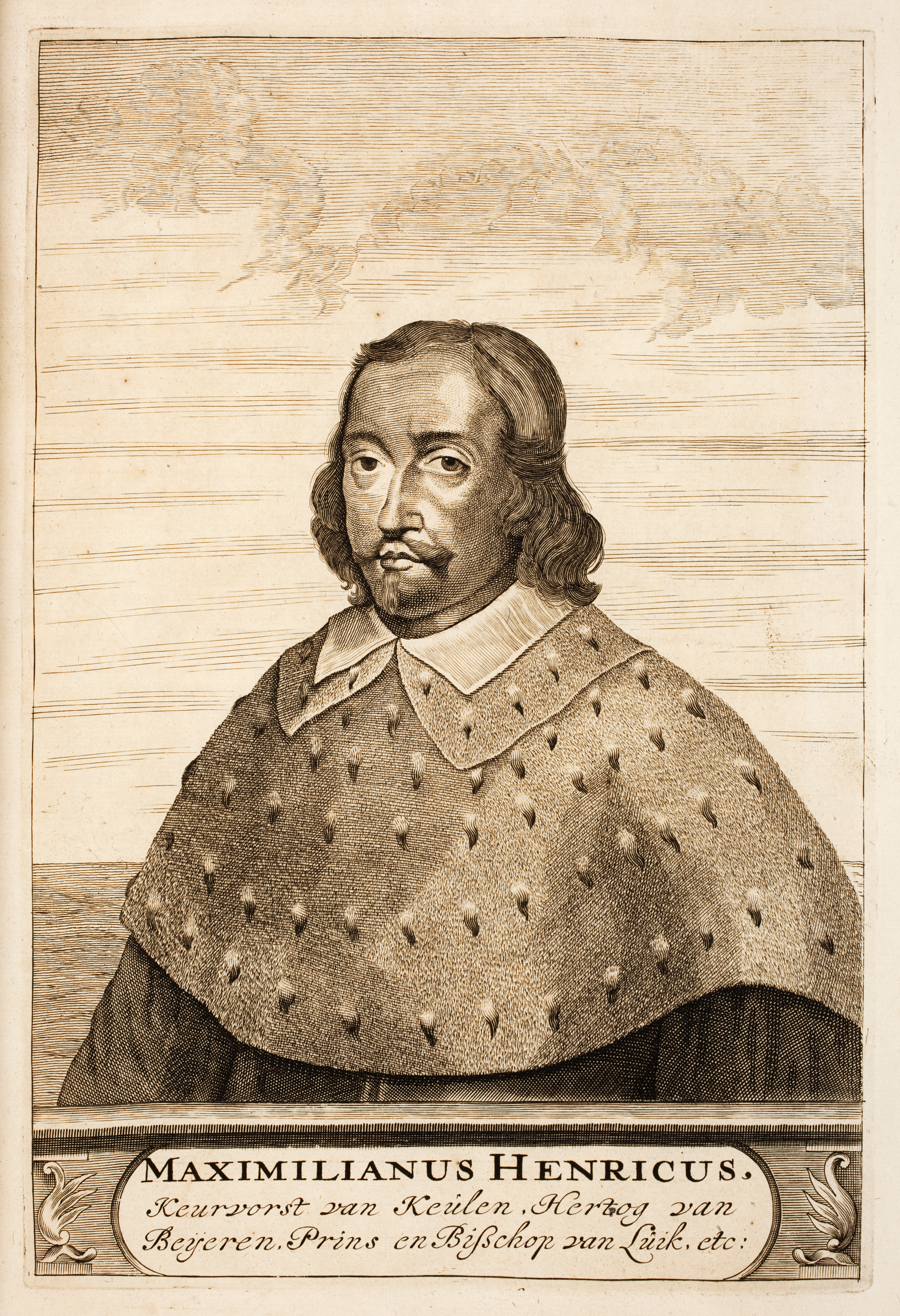
Maximilian Henry of Bavaria

Maximilian Henry of Bavaria (German: Maximilian Heinrich von Bayern: 8 October 1621 – 3 June 1688) was the third son and fourth child of Albert VI, Duke of Bavaria, and his wife, Mechthilde von Leuchtenberg. In 1650, he was named Archbishop-Elector of Cologne, Bishop of Hildesheim and Bishop of Liège succeeding his uncle, Ferdinand of Bavaria. He worked throughout his career with the French to limit the authority of the Holy Roman Emperor, and participated in the Franco-Dutch War on the opposite side from the Empire.

== Early life ==
Around 1640, Maximilian was attending the Gymnasium Tricoronatum, and there he met Franz Egon of Fürstenberg and his brother Wilhelm Egon von Fürstenberg. This friendship would guide all three careers. Before 1650, Maximilian was elected coadjutor in Cologne, which made him the clear successor for his uncle. By that time, the Egons of Fürstenberg had joined the privy council of the Archbishop-Elector, and they assisted their friend when his uncle died. Maximilian made Franz his prime minister.

== Career ==
When Ferdinand III, Holy Roman Emperor died in 1657, Maximillian and the Electors of Mainz and Trier sent William to Ferdinand Maria, Elector of Bavaria to see if he would be willing to be put forth as the next Emperor in opposition to his Habsburg cousins, but he declined. When it became clear that Leopold I was going to win the election, Maximilian worked with the other Electors to put restrictions on his authority, forcing him to sign a statement that he would not support Spain in any way. Maximilian crowned Leopold on 31 July 1658. Shortly after, he reminded the Emperor that he must abide by the restrictions, as that was the only way he won the crown. Another of the terms that Maximilian and his fellow electors imposed on the Emperor was that the Archbishop-Electors should have the freedom to remove the Papal nuncio from the Empire. In 1662, there was an effort started at Cologne to join the Imperial and French churches to force changes at Rome, though this did not go very far.

In 1659, Cardinal Mazarin asked Maximilian and the Elector of Mainz to oversee negotiations to end the Franco-Spanish War. Maximilian thereafter sent William regularly to the negotiations and ultimately the signing of the Treaty of the Pyrenees.

In 1665, William brought Maximilian funds from France to raise an army. The intent was for Cologne to support French interests in the upcoming War of Devolution. Maximilian agreed, as he hoped to gain additional territory for his own realm in the bargain. In 1667, William convinced Maximilian to send him to Vienna to explore the Emperor's feelings about the succession for the weak new Charles II of Spain, perhaps partitioning the Netherlands from Spain upon his death. The French were happy to have this sent in Maximilian's name, so that they could determine the answer without receiving any blame.

In the run up to the Franco-Dutch War, Maximilian continued to work with the French, though the people in his territories were uneasy. In 1670, the city leaders of Cologne received Imperial permission to host a Dutch garrison of 5000 infantry and 1000 cavalry, hoping to be protected against an expected French army. In 1671, Maximilian agreed that the French could freely travel through his territory, and the French began establishing warehouses and strategic infrastructure. When the people began to complain about these preparations for war, Maximilian blamed William, but was mollified by the receipt of additional French funds. When the Emperor joined the war on the side of the Dutch in 1672, Maximilian's lands were attacked, and he sought more French help and funding. When William was arrested on 14 February 1674 for his work against the Habsburgs, Maximilian quickly negotiated an end to Cologne's involvement in the war. The treaty with the Dutch included a general amnesty for officers on both sides, with an exception for those convicted of treason, inserted to allow the Austrians to continue to hold William. By December of that year, Maximilian signed a treaty with Austria to never allow the Fürstenbergs to work for him again. This treaty was kept secret until 1677, as Maximilian was afraid of French reprisal for his betrayal of their agent.

In 1683, he was named Bishop of Münster, but Pope Innocent XI refused to confirm this nomination. He died in 1688 and was succeeded by Joseph Clemens of Bavaria.

Maximilian Henry of Bavaria House of Wittelsbach Born: 1621 Died: 1688
Catholic Church titles
Regnal titles
Preceded by Ferdinand of Bavaria	Archbishop-Elector of Cologne; Duke of Westphalia; 1650–1688	Succeeded by Joseph Clemens of Bavaria
Preceded by Ferdinand of Bavaria	Prince-Bishop of Liège; 1650–1688	Succeeded by John Louis of Elderen
Preceded by Ferdinand of Bavaria	Prince-Bishop of Hildesheim; 1650–1688	Succeeded by Jost Edmund von Brabeck
Preceded by Ferdinand II	Prince-Bishop of Münster; 1683–1688	Succeeded by Frederick Christian
