= Joseph Clemens of Bavaria =

Member of the Wittelsbach dynasty of Bavaria

- Archbishop of Cologne
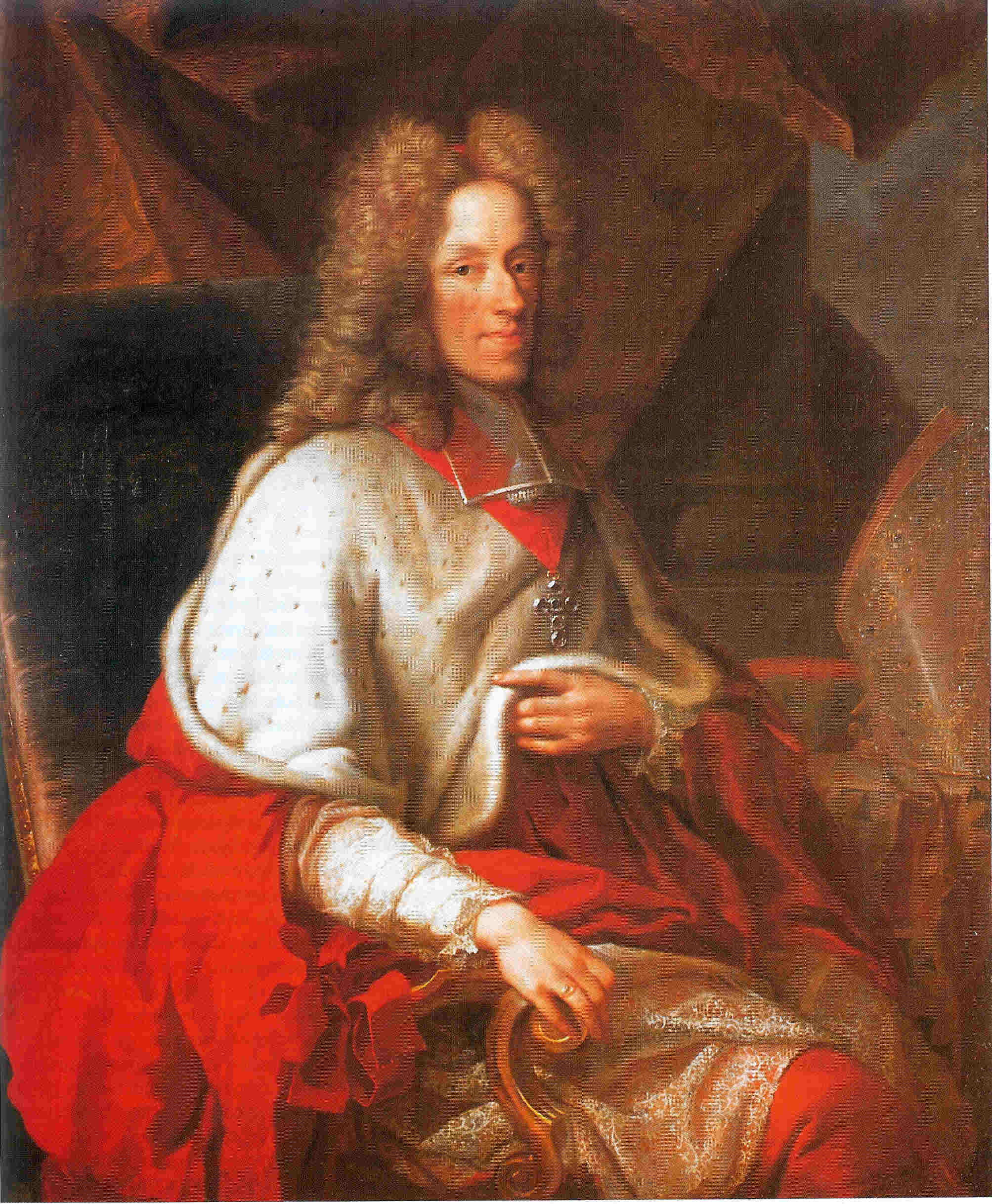
- Joseph Clemens of Bavaria
- Church: Catholic Church
- Archdiocese: Cologne
- Installed: 19 July 1688
- Term ended: 12 November 1723
- Predecessor: Maximilian Henry of Bavaria
- Successor: Clemens August of Bavaria

Orders
- Ordination: 18 December 1705 (priest)
- Consecration: 1 May 1707 (bishop) by François Fénelon

Personal details
- Born: Joseph Clemens von Bayern von Wittelsbach; 4 December 1671 Munich, Bavaria
- Died: 12 November 1723 (aged 51) Bonn, Cologne
- Buried: Cologne Cathedral

Prince Joseph Clemens of Bavaria (German: Joseph Clemens von Bayern von Wittelsbach) (4 December 1671 – 12 November 1723) was a member of the Wittelsbach dynasty of Bavaria and also served as the Archbishop-Elector of Cologne from 1688 to 1723.

== Biography ==
The third son of Ferdinand Maria, Elector of Bavaria and his wife, Henriette Adelaide of Savoy, Joseph Clemens was designated by his parents for a life in the church. He became Archbishop of Cologne on 19 July 1688 after the death of Maximilian Henry of Bavaria, and his appointment to that post by Pope Innocent XI was one cause of the Nine Years' War. He later also served as Prince-Bishop of Liège, of Regensburg, of Freising and of Hildesheim.

Joseph Clemens was the younger brother of Maximilian II Emanuel, Elector of Bavaria. As did his brother, Maximillian II, Joseph Clemens allied with Kingdom of France during the War of the Spanish Succession and was forced to flee his residence Bonn in 1702 and found refuge at the French court. Joseph Clemens was put under the Imperial ban and deprived of his lands in 1706.

The war between France and the Holy Roman Empire was finally ended in 1714 with the Treaty of Baden, which restored Joseph Clemens. He died in Bonn and was buried at the Cologne Cathedral. Joseph Clemens was succeeded by his nephew Clemens August of Bavaria.

== Bibliography ==
- Goorts, Roeland (2019). "The balance of power in the Principality of Liège". In Thomas, Werner (ed.). War, State, and Society in Liège - How a Small State of the Holy Roman Empire survived the Nine Year's War (1688–1697). Leuven University Press. pp. 45–80. doi:10.2307/j.ctv9hvrb2. ISBN 978-94-6270-131-1. JSTOR j.ctv9hvrb2.8.
- Cont, Alessandro (2018). La Chiesa dei principi - Le relazioni tra Reichskirche, dinastie sovrane tedesche e stati italiani (1688–1763) (in Italian). Trento: Provincia autonoma di Trento. pp. 19–55.

Joseph Clemens of Bavaria House of Wittelsbach Born: 5 December 1671 in Munich Died: 12 November 1723 in Bonn
Catholic Church titles
Preceded by Albert Sigismund of Bavaria	Prince-Bishop of Freising; 1685 – 1694	Succeeded by Johannn Francis of Eckher of Kapfing and Liechteneck
Preceded by Albrecht Sigismund von Bayern	Prince-Bishop of Regensburg; 1685 – 1694	Succeeded by Clemens August of Bavaria
Preceded by Maximilian Henry of Bavaria	Archbishop of Cologne and Duke of Westphalia; 1688 – 1723	Succeeded by Clemens August of Bavaria
Preceded by Jobst Edmund of Brabeck	Prince-Bishop of Hildesheim; 1702 – 1723	Succeeded by Clemens August of Bavaria
Preceded by Jean Louis d'Elderen	Prince-Bishop of Liège; 1694 – 1723	Succeeded by Georges-Louis de Berghes
