= Joachim of Fürstenberg =

Joachim
- Count of Fürstenberg-Heiligenberg
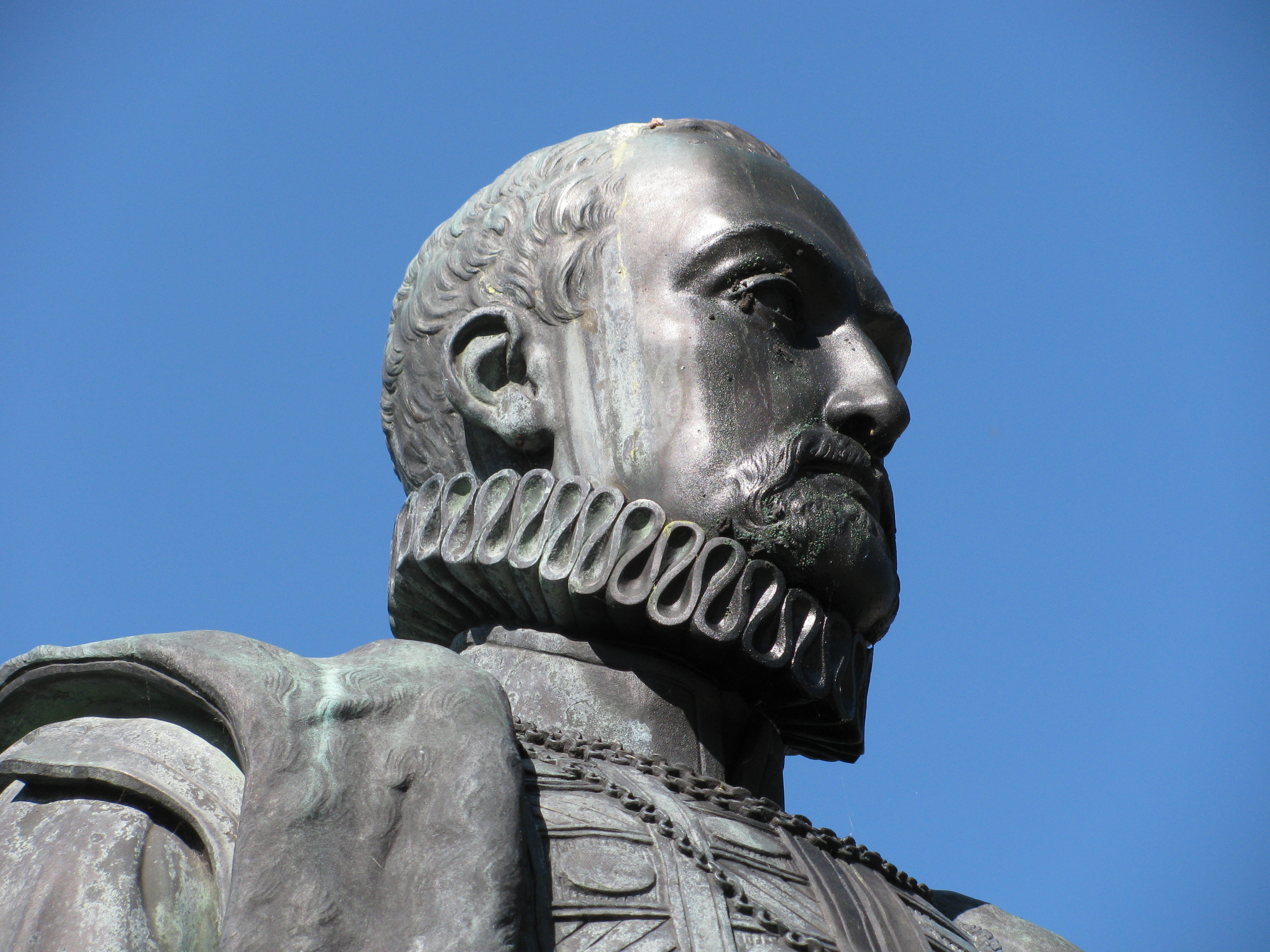
- Statue of Joachim of Fürstenberg
- Successor: Frederick IV of Fürstenberg
- Born: 25 January 1538
- Died: 21 October 1598 (age 60)
- Spouse: Anna of Zimmern
- Issue: Frederick of Fürstenberg; Anna Constantina of Fürstenberg; Eleonora of Fürstenberg
- Father: Frederick II of Fürstenberg

Joachim of Fürstenberg (1538–1598) was a Count of Fürstenberg-Heiligenberg, a vassalate of the Holy Roman Empire. His wife was Countess Anna of Zimmern. He was succeeded by his son, Frederick IV of Fürstenberg.

Joachim was the youngest son of Count Frederick II of Fürstenberg (1496–1559) and Countess Anna of Werdenberg. After the division of his inheritance with his brothers Christoph and Heinrich, he retained the allodial estates of Heiligenberg, Trochtelfingen, and Jungnau, which had been brought into his family by his mother in 1534. In 1562, he married the wealthy Countess Anna von Zimmern (1545–1602), the eldest of the ten daughters of Count Froben Christoph of Zimmern and a sister of Count Wilhelm of Zimmern. They had fifteen children, of whom only four survived their parents.

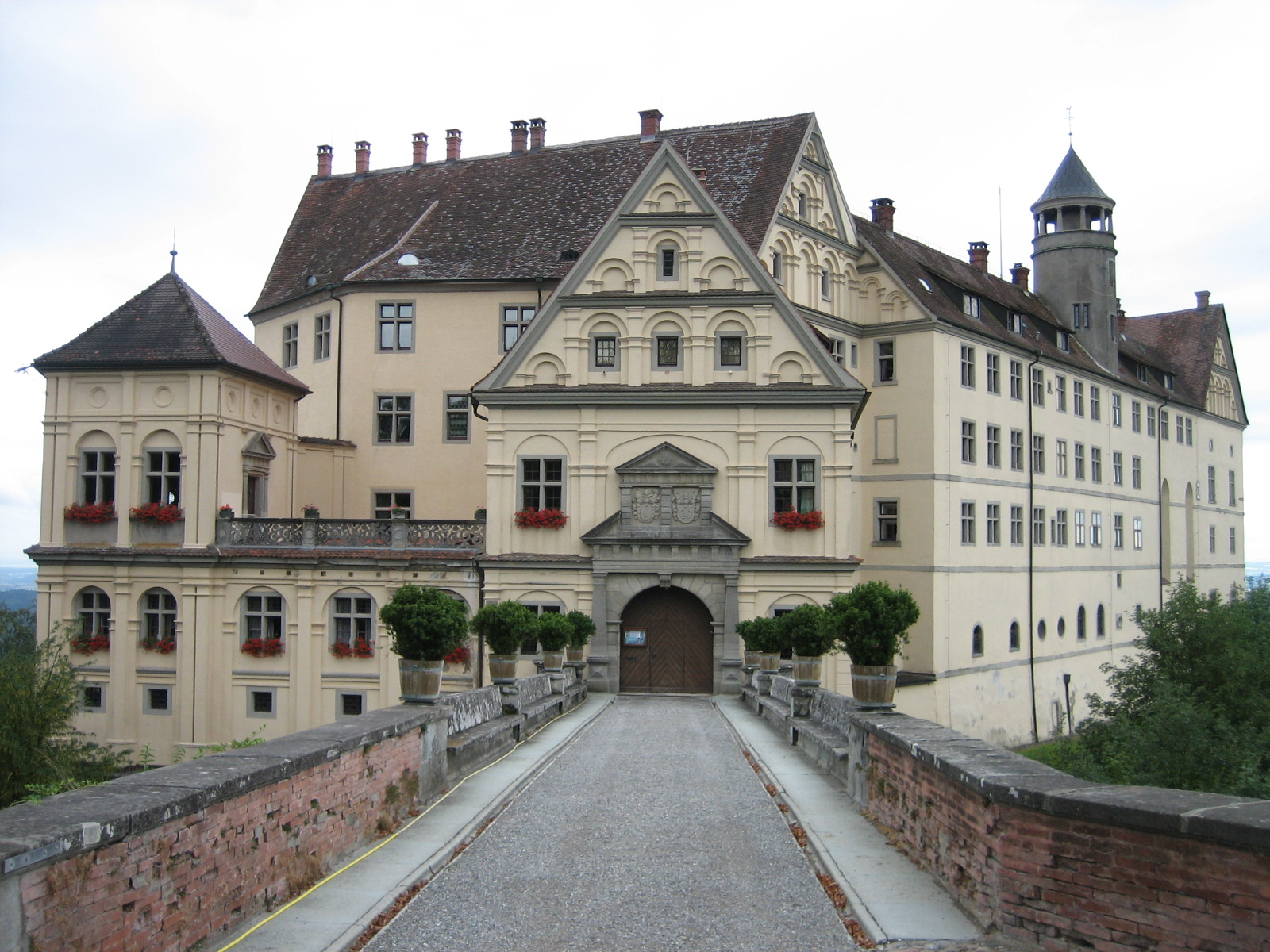
Heiligenberg Castle

He rarely appeared at the courts of Maximilian II and Rudolf II, but was entrusted by the emperors with various tasks in Swabia. Heiligenberg was his favorite residence. His portrait hangs in the Knights' Hall. Through his prudent and successful management, he was able to significantly expand and develop Heiligenberg Castle; his coat of arms at the castle entrance shows 1569 as the year of its construction. His future daughter-in-law Elisabeth, daughter of Count Alwig von Sulz, spent three years at his castle until her marriage to his eldest son Frederick on September 9, 1584. The magnificent Knights' Hall and the castle chapel had been completed for the wedding. During his father's lifetime, Frederick chose Werdenberg Castle in Trochtelfingen as his residence.

== Issue ==
Joachim and his wife Anna had the following children:

- Frederick, his successor (1598–1617)
- Konstanzia (1577–1620), married Count Rudolf II of Helfenstein-Wiesensteig (1560–1601) and Freiherr Konrad von Boyneburg (1578–1626)
- Eleonora (1578–1651), married Count Rudolf III of Helfenstein-Wiesensteig (1585–1627), stepson of her sister Konstanzia
