= Three Kingdoms (manhua) =

Graphic novel series by Lee Chi Ching

- Cover of Volume 1

三國志 Sān Guó Zhì
- Genre: Historical romance, romantic fantasy, wuxia
- Author: Lee Chi Ching, Yū Terashima
- Illustrator: Lee Chi Ching
- Publisher: Culturecom Limited
- Other publishers: Media Factory
- Original run: 1991–1999
- Volumes: 14

Three Kingdoms (simplified Chinese: 三国志; traditional Chinese: 三國志; pinyin: Sān Guó Zhì), also known as Sangokushi in Japanese, is a Hong Kong manhua based on Yū Terashima's novel Sangokushi Meigentan, which is loosely adapted from Records of the Three Kingdoms and the 14th century novel Romance of the Three Kingdoms. The manhua was illustrated by Lee Chi Ching and was released in 14 volumes between 1991 and 1999 by Culturecom Limited. It was also the first Hong Kong manhua to be published in cooperation with Japanese publishers.

Three Kingdoms was followed by a sequel, Three Kingdoms: The Last Chapter (simplified Chinese: 三国志完结篇; traditional Chinese: 三國志完結編; pinyin: Sān Guó Zhì Wán Jié Piān), also known as Sangokushi: Kanketsuhen in Japanese.
