= Principality of Fürstenberg =

Principality of the Holy Roman Empire

County (Principality) of Fürstenberg Grafschaft (Fürstentum) Fürstenberg (German)
- 1250–1806
- Coat of arms

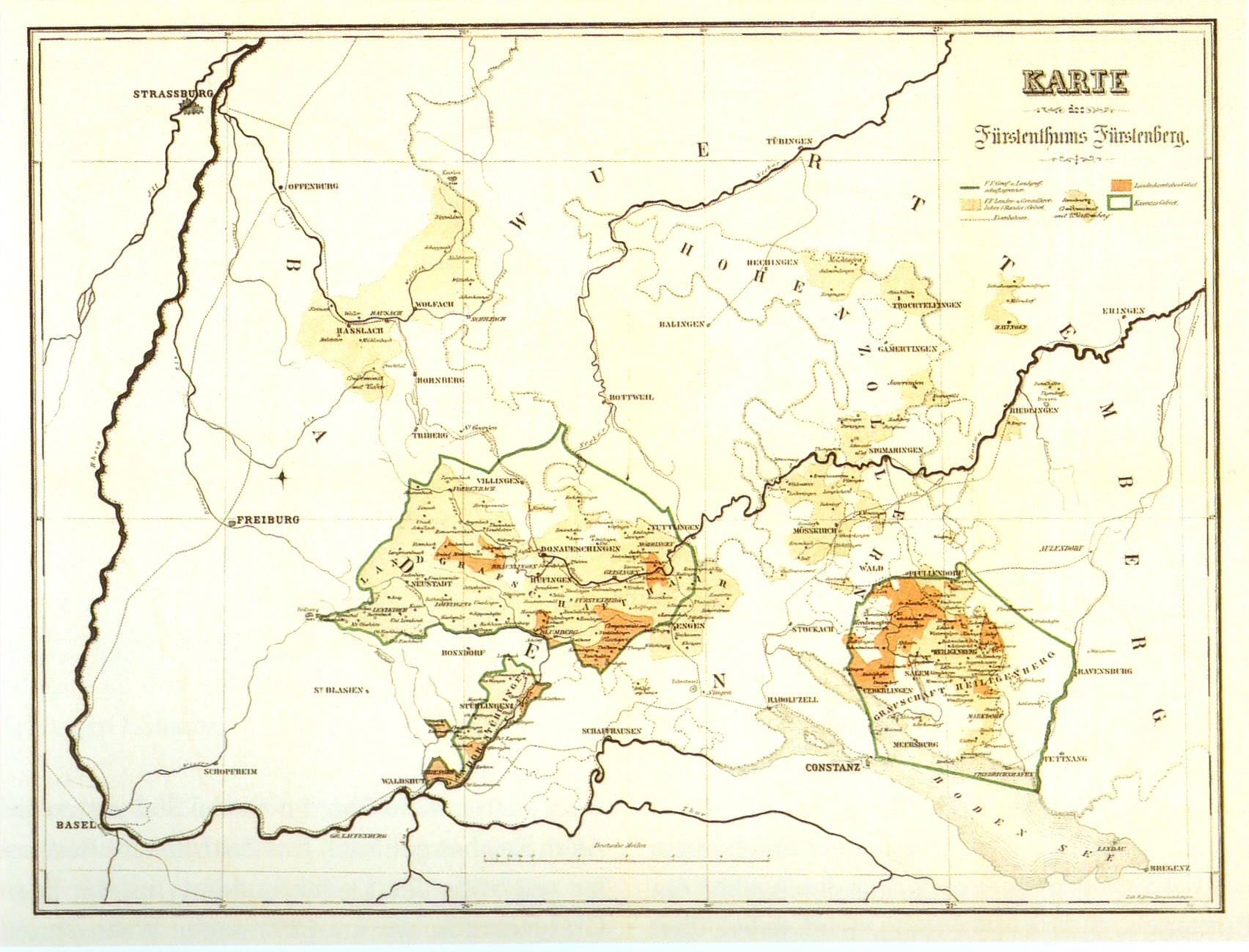
- Fürstenberg territories in 1806
- Status: Principality
- Capital: Fürstenberg
- Common languages: Alemannic
- Historical era: Middle Ages; Early modern period
  - Egino IV of Urach inherited Zähringen: 1218
  - County established: 1250
  - Partitioned into Fürstenberg and Wolfach: 1408
  - Mediatized: 1806
Preceded by	Succeeded by
House of Zähringen	Fürstenberg-Fürstenberg; Fürstenberg-Wolfach

Fürstenberg was a county (German: Grafschaft), and later a principality (Fürstentum), of the Holy Roman Empire in Swabia, which was located in present-day southern Baden-Württemberg, Germany. Its ruling family was the House of Fürstenberg.

== History ==
The county emerged when Egino IV, Count of Urach by marriage, inherited large parts of the Duchy of Zähringen upon the death of Duke Berthold V in 1218, and it was originally called the county of Freiburg. Egino's grandson, Count Henry, started naming himself after his residence at Fürstenberg Castle around 1250.

The county was partitioned in 1284 between itself and the lower county of Villingen, and then again in 1408 between Fürstenberg-Fürstenberg and Fürstenberg-Wolfach.

Over the centuries, the various rulers expanded their territories to include the Landgraviate of Baar, the County of Heiligenberg, the Lordships of Gundelfingen, Hausen, Höwen, and Meßkirch, and the Landgraviate of Stühlingen in Germany, as well as domains around Křivoklát Castle (German: Pürglitz), Bohemia, Tavíkovice (German: Taikowitz) in Moravia and Weitra in Austria.

In 1664, Fürstenberg-Heiligenberg was raised to a principality and received a vote at the Reichstag. In 1744, various Fürstenberg territories were reunified to the Principality of Fürstenberg-Fürstenberg, as all lines except one had become extinct.

The Rheinbundakte of 1806 dissolved the state of Fürstenberg. Most of its territory was given to Baden, and smaller parts were given to Württemberg, Hohenzollern-Sigmaringen, and Bavaria.

== Geography ==
As of 1789, the territory consisted of five larger, isolated parts as well as several smaller exclaves. The five larger parts were:

- The Landgraviate of Baar and the Lordship of Höwen. Towns include Donaueschingen, Hüfingen, Engen, and Neustadt. Also includes Fürstenberg Castle. Bordered by Further Austria, Württemberg, the Abbacy of St. Blaise, and others. Given to Baden.
- The Lordship of Hausen. Towns: Hausach, Wolfach, Haslach. Bordered by: Prince-Bishopric of Strasbourg, Württemberg, Further Austria, Hohengeroldseck, Imperial City of Zell, Imperial Valley of Harmersbach. Given to Baden.
- The Landgraviate of Stühlingen. Towns: Stühlingen. Bordered by: Abbacy of St. Blaise, Swiss Confederacy, Landgraviate of Klettgau. Given to Baden.
- The Lordship of Meßkirch. Towns: Meßkirch. Bordered by: Hohenzollern-Sigmaringen, Abbacy of Zwiefalten, Further Austria, Abbacy of Buchau, and others. Given to Baden and Hohenzollern-Sigmaringen.
- The County of Heiligenberg. Towns: Heiligenberg. Bordered by: Königsegg, Abbacy of Weingarten, Austria, Lake Constance, Prince-Bishopric of Constance, Abbacy of Salmannsweiler, Imperial City of Überlingen, Imperial City of Pfullendorf, and others. Given to Baden.

The smaller exclaves included the towns of Ennabeuren, Salmendingen, Neufra, Trochtelfingen, Hayingen, and others.

As of 1806, Fürstenberg had an area of 2,000 km^{2} and a population of 100,000. Its capital was Donaueschingen.

=== Rulers of Fürstenberg ===
(Note: The analysis given here will go further back to the origins of the Counts of Urach/Freiburg, from which the Fürstenbergs descended in direct line, and with which shared the coats of arms and still exchanged property in the 13th century. After the fall of the main Freiburg line in 1458, the Fürstenberg branch (separated in 1236) emerged as the main line of the dynasty.)

Partitions of Urach, Freiburg and Fürstenberg under Urach/Fürstenberg rule

County of Urach (1040-1218)	Rule by the House of Zahringen (1098-1218)
Raised to: County of Freiburg (1218-1385)
County of Badenweiler (1st creation) (1271-1320)	County of Fürstenberg (1236-1614)	County of Haslach (1284-1386)
Annexed to the House of Habsburg	County of Badenweiler (2nd creation, Freiburg line) (1385-1458)
County of Wolfach (1408-1490)
County of Geisingen (1441-1483)
Annexed to the House of Baden
County of Heiligenberg (1559-1664); Raised to: Principality of Fürstenberg (1664-1716)
County of Möhringen (1599-1641)
County of Messkirch (1614-1716); Raised to: Principality of Messkirch (1716-1744)
County of Stühlingen (1614-1716)
Principality of Fürstenberg (1716-1804) (Stühlingen line)
County of Weitra (1744-1806)
Principality of Pürglitz (1762-1806)
(mediatisation in 1806 divided between Württemberg, Baden and Hohenzollern-Sigmaringen)	(mediatised to Austria in 1806)

Table of rulers

(Note: The numbering for this family is somehow hard to ascertain. The numbering here follows two sequences: the sequence of the County of Fürstenberg, and the sequence of the County of Freiburg post-1237. Despite there is a established numbering for the counts Henry of Fürstenberg (which excludes count Henry of Trimberg), the counts named Conrad and John aren't usually numbered in sources, and the numbering for counts named Egon and Frederick is also not simple to follow. Therefore, the numbering here for both numberings is sequential, to avoid holes and other confusions. Any other explanation regarding this matter is given in footnote.)

Ruler	Born	Reign	Ruling part	Consort	Death	Notes
Egon I the Elder	?	c.1040-1050	County of Urach	Unknown four children	c.1050	The oldest known member of the family and also the first known count of Urach.
Egon II	c.1030? Son of Egon I	1050 – 5 November 1105	County of Urach	Kunigunde four children	5 November 1105 aged 74–75?	
Egon III the Younger	c.1090? Son of Egon II and Kunigunde	5 November 1105 – 25 July 1160	County of Urach	Kunigunde of Wasserburg three children	25 July 1160 aged 69–70?	
Egon IV the Bearded	c.1150? Son of Egon III and Kunigunde of Wasserburg	25 July 1160 – 12 January 1230	County of Urach (until 1218) County of Freiburg (with Urach; from 1218)	Agnes of Zähringen three children	12 January 1230; Freiamt aged 79–80?	Through Egon's marriage, the Urach family (later Fürstenberg family) received effectively the lands that would later become the county of Fürstenberg.
Egon V & I the Younger	1185; Bad Urach; Son of Egon IV & I and Agnes of Zähringen	12 January 1230 – 1237	County of Freiburg	Adelaide of Neuffen (d.6 September 1239) eight children	1237 aged 54–55	
Henry I	1215; Third son of Egon V & I and Adelaide of Neuffen	1237 – 6 January 1284	County of Fürstenberg	Agnes of Truhendingen (d.1294) seven children	6 January 1284 aged 68–69	Children of Egon V/II, divided their inheritance. After Berthold's death, Urach rejoined Freiburg.
Berthold	c.1220 Fourth son of Egon V & I and Adelaide of Neuffen	1237 – October 1261	County of Urach	Agatha of Lechsgemund-Greisbach (d.1254/22 October 1261) one child	October 1261 aged 20–21	Children of Egon V/II, divided their inheritance. After Berthold's death, Urach rejoined Freiburg.
Conrad I	1226; Fifth son of Egon V & II and Adelaide of Neuffen	1237 – 24 September 1271	County of Freiburg	Sophia of Hohenzollern (d.1270) five children	24 September 1271 aged 44–45	Children of Egon V/II, divided their inheritance. After Berthold's death, Urach rejoined Freiburg.
In 1341 Urach rejoined Freiburg
Regency of Sophia of Hohenzollern (1271-1277)						Children of Conrad, divided their inheritance.
Egon II	1263; First son of Conrad I and Sophia of Hohenzollern	24 September 1271 – 1317	County of Freiburg	Catharina of Lichtenberg (d.1283); 1271 seven children	1317 aged 53–54	Children of Conrad, divided their inheritance.
Henry	c.1265? Second son of Conrad I and Sophia of Hohenzollern	24 September 1271 – 1303	County of Badenweiler	Anna of Wartenberg (d.1321); 1281 two children	1303 aged 37–38	Children of Conrad, divided their inheritance.
Frederick I	c.1250 Son of Henry I and Agnes of Truhendingen	6 January 1284 – 1 May 1296	County of Fürstenberg	Udehild of Wolfach (1254-1305) c.1275 five children	1 May 1296 aged 45–46	Children of Henry I, divided their inheritance.
Egon (VI)	c.1260 Son of Henry I and Agnes of Truhendingen	6 January 1284 – 23 April 1324	County of Haslach	Verena of Baden-Hachberg (c.1270-1322); 19 January 1298 seven children	23 April 1324 aged 63–64	Children of Henry I, divided their inheritance.
Regency of Conrad of Fürstenberg, Canon of Konstanz (1296-1303)						
Henry II	c.1275 Wolfach; Son of Frederick I and Udehild of Wolfach	1 May 1296 – 14 December 1337	County of Fürstenberg	Verena of Freiburg, Countess of Badenweiler (1285-25 December 1320); 1307 seven children	14 December 1337 aged 61–62	
Margaret	c.1285? First daughter of Henry and Anna of Wartenberg	1303-c.1330	County of Badenweiler (at Badenweiler proper)	Otto, Count of Strassberg (d.1318) c.1300 at least one child	c.1330 aged 44–45	Children of Henry, divided their inheritance, which had slightly different fates: while Verena's part went directly to Fürstenberg, Margaret's part was annexed to the Lordship of Strassberg, and was only annexed to Fürstenberg in 1364.
Verena	c.1285? Second daughter of Henry and Anna of Wartenberg	1303 – 25 December 1320	County of Badenweiler (at Hausach)	Henry II, Count of Fürstenberg; 1307 seven children	25 December 1320 aged 34–35	Children of Henry, divided their inheritance, which had slightly different fates: while Verena's part went directly to Fürstenberg, Margaret's part was annexed to the Lordship of Strassberg, and was only annexed to Fürstenberg in 1364.
In 1320 Hausach joined Fürstenberg; Badenweiler was annexed to Strassberg domains in 1330, and went to Fürstenberg in 1364
Conrad II	c.1300? Son of Egon II and Catharina of Lichtenberg	1317 – 10 July 1350	County of Freiburg	Catherine of Lorraine (d.13 March 1316); 9 July 1290 three children Anna of Signau (d.1330); 1330 no children	10 July 1350; Freiburg im Breisgau aged 49–50?	
Godfrey	c.1310 Son of Egon (VI) and Verena of Baden-Hachberg	23 April 1324 – April/June 1341	County of Haslach	Anna of Montfort-Feldkirch (d.27 October 1373); 1323 five children	April/June 1341 aged 30–31	
Conrad I	c.1305 First son of Henry II and Verena of Freiburg	14 December 1337 – 1370	County of Fürstenberg (at Wartenberg	Adelaide of Griesenberg (d.8 June 1372) c.1340 no children	23 February 1367 aged 61–62	Children of Henry II, possibly divided the inheritance. After Conrad and John's deaths, Wartenberg, Wolfach and Hausach returned to Fürstenberg's main land at Baar.
John I	c.1305 Second son of Henry II and Verena of Freiburg	14 December 1337 – 1365	County of Fürstenberg (at Wolfach and Hausach)	Joanna of Signau (d.1358); 8 August 1348 one child	1365 aged 59–60	Children of Henry II, possibly divided the inheritance. After Conrad and John's deaths, Wartenberg, Wolfach and Hausach returned to Fürstenberg's main land at Baar.
Henry III	c.1305 Third son of Henry II and Verena of Freiburg	14 December 1337 – 23 February 1367	County of Fürstenberg (at Baar)	Anna of Montfort-Tettnang (1310-1373) c.1335 six children	23 February 1367 aged 61–62	Children of Henry II, possibly divided the inheritance. After Conrad and John's deaths, Wartenberg, Wolfach and Hausach returned to Fürstenberg's main land at Baar.
In 1365 and 1370 Wartenberg, Hausach and Wolfach rejoined Baar/Fürstenberg
Hugo	c.1330 First son of Godfrey and Anna of Montfort-Feldkirch	April/June 1341 – 24 May 1371	County of Haslach	Adelaide of Krenkingen (d.15 July 1359); 1323 three children	24 May 1371 aged 30–31	Children of Godfrey, divided their inheritance. After Henry's death Trimberg returned to Hausach
Henry (IV)	c.1330 Second son of Godfrey and Anna of Montfort-Feldkirch	April/June 1341 – 30 November 1355	County of Haslach (at Trimberg)	Irmengard of Werdenberg (d.28 February 1358) c.1350 one child	30 November 1355 aged 27–28	Children of Godfrey, divided their inheritance. After Henry's death Trimberg returned to Hausach
In 1355 Trimberg rejoined Haslach
Frederick	1316; Freiburg im Breisgau; First son of Conrad II and Catherine of Lorraine	10 July 1350 – 9 November 1356	County of Freiburg	Anna of Baden-Sausenberg (d.28 February 1331); 1330 one child Mahaut de Montfaucon c.1335? no children	9 November 1356; Freiburg im Breisgau aged 39–40?	
Clara	c.1330 Freiburg im Breisgau; Daughter of Frederickand Anna of Baden-Sausenberg	9 November 1356 – 9 June 1358 9 June 1358 – 1386	County of Freiburg (at Lichteneck Castle only from 1358)	Godfrey II, Count Palatine of Tübingen (d.1369); 1340 five children	1386 aged 55–56	Chosen by the city of Freiburg as the new ruler; the succession was contested by her uncle, who succeeded in deposing her in 1358. She however retained a seat at Lichteneck Castle for herself.
Egon III	c.1320 Freiburg im Breisgau; Second son of Conrad II and Catherine of Lorraine	9 June 1358 – 30 March 1368	County of Freiburg	Verena of Neuchâtel (d.15 June 1374); 1360 two children	3 September 1385; Freiburg im Breisgau aged 64–65?	Contested the succession of his niece in 1356, and won in 1358, deposing her; In 1368, after a heavy defeat, sold Freiburg to the Habsburgs. In compensation, he was given the County of Badenweiler by his cousin, Count Henry IV of Fürstenberg.
Egon III	c.1320 Freiburg im Breisgau; Second son of Conrad II and Catherine of Lorraine	30 March 1368 – 3 September 1385	County of Badenweiler	Verena of Neuchâtel (d.15 June 1374); 1360 two children	3 September 1385; Freiburg im Breisgau aged 64–65?	Contested the succession of his niece in 1356, and won in 1358, deposing her; In 1368, after a heavy defeat, sold Freiburg to the Habsburgs. In compensation, he was given the County of Badenweiler by his cousin, Count Henry IV of Fürstenberg.
In 1368 Freiburg was annexed to the Habsburgs
Henry IV	1344; Wolfach; Son of Henry III and Anna of Montfort-Tettnang	23 February 1367 – 15 August 1408	County of Fürstenberg	Adelaide of Hohenlohe-Weikersheim (d. 6 November 1370); 1367 one child Sophia of Zollern (1345-29 March 1427); 1372 eight children	15 August 1408 aged 61–62	
John II	c.1350 Haslach im Kinzigtal; Son of Hugo and Adelaide of Krenkingen	24 May 1371 – 9 July 1386	County of Haslach	Anna of Thierstein (d.7 November 1382) c.1370? no children	9 July 1386; Sempachaged 35–36	Children of Godfrey, divided their inheritance. After John's death Haslach returned to Fürstenberg.
Adelaide	1356; Haslach im Kinzigtal; Daughter of Hugo and Adelaide of Krenkingen	24 May 1371 – 19 March 1413	County of Haslach (at Braunlingen)	Frederick XI, Count of Hohenzollern; 1377 six children	19 March 1413 aged 56–57	Children of Godfrey, divided their inheritance. After John's death Haslach returned to Fürstenberg.
In 1386 Haslach rejoined Fürstenberg; in 1413 Braunlingen was annexed to Hohenzollern
Conrad III	1372; Son of Egon III and Verena of Neuchâtel	3 September 1385 – 16 April 1424	County of Badenweiler	Marie de Vergy (d.29 March 1407); 1390 two children Alix, Lady of Baux; 1413 no children	16 April 1424; Neuchâtel aged 51–52	In 1395 inherited, from his aunt Isabelle, the county of Neuchâtel.
Henry V	c.1380 First son of Henry IV and Sophia of Zollern	15 August 1408 – 10 August 1441	County of Fürstenberg	Verena of Baden-Hachberg (3 December 1392 - 8 Dec 1416); 1413 three children Anna of Tengen-Nellenburg (d. 21 April 1427); 1419 two children Elisabeth of Lupfen (d.1437); 14 March 1429 one child	10 August 1441 aged 60–61	Children of Henry IV, divided their inheritance.
Conrad II	c.1380 Second son of Henry IV and Sophia of Zollern	15 August 1408 – 3 May 1419	County of Wolfach	Adelaide of Zweibrücken-Bitsch (d. 1 October 1452); 2 May/15 June 1413 two children	3 May 1419 aged 61–62	Children of Henry IV, divided their inheritance.
Adelaide of Zweibrücken-Bitsch	c.1390 Daughter of Simon IV, Count of Zweibrücken-Bitsch and Hildegard of Lichtenberg	3 May 1419 – 1 October 1452	County of Wolfach (at Wolfach proper)	Conrad II (c.1380-3 May 1419); 2 May/15 June 1413 two children	1 October 1452 aged 61–62	Widow and son of Conrad III. While Adelaide stayed at Wolfach, Henry VI (until 1432 under regency of his uncles of Fürstenberg) moved his capital to Hausach. After Adelaide's death her seat at Wolfach also reverted to Henry. He left no children, and after his death, Wolfach returned to Fürstenberg. For a biography of Henry VI, see this link.
Regency of Henry V, Count of Fürstenberg and Egon of Fürstenberg (1419-1432)						Widow and son of Conrad III. While Adelaide stayed at Wolfach, Henry VI (until 1432 under regency of his uncles of Fürstenberg) moved his capital to Hausach. After Adelaide's death her seat at Wolfach also reverted to Henry. He left no children, and after his death, Wolfach returned to Fürstenberg. For a biography of Henry VI, see this link.
Henry VI	c.1415 Son of Conrad II and Adelaide of Zweibrücken-Bitsch	3 May 1419 – 30 November 1490	County of Wolfach (at Hausach)	Margaretha Küfferin no children	30 November 1490; Wolfach aged 74–75	Widow and son of Conrad III. While Adelaide stayed at Wolfach, Henry VI (until 1432 under regency of his uncles of Fürstenberg) moved his capital to Hausach. After Adelaide's death her seat at Wolfach also reverted to Henry. He left no children, and after his death, Wolfach returned to Fürstenberg. For a biography of Henry VI, see this link.
In 1490 Wolfach rejoined Fürstenberg
John	26 May 1396; Neuchâtel; Son of Conrad III and Marie de Vergy	16 April 1424 – 19 February 1458	County of Badenweiler (at Neuchâtel only from 1444)	Marie of Châlon-Arlay (d.1465); 13 July 1416 three children	19 February 1458; Neuchâtel aged 62	In 1444 sold Badenweiler to the Habsburgs, keeping only Neuchâtel. After his death, Neuchâtel was annexed to the Baden domains.
In 1444 Badenweiler was annexed to the Habsburgs; in 1458 Neuchâtel was annexed to Baden
John III	c.1410? Son of Henry V and Verena of Baden-Hachberg	10 August 1441 – 30 March 1443	County of Geisingen	Anna of Kirchberg (d. 1469); 2 May/15 June 1413 two children	30 March 1443; Fürstenberg aged 32–33	Children of Henry V, divided their inheritance.
Conrad III	c.1430 Son of Henry V and Elisabeth of Lupfen	10 August 1441 – 24 April 1484	County of Fürstenberg	Kunigunde of Matsch (d. 19 April 1469); 1462 three children	21 April 1484 aged 53–54	Children of Henry V, divided their inheritance.
Egon (VII)	c.1430? Son of John II and Anna of Kirchberg	30 March 1443 – 1483	County of Geisingen	Unmarried	1483 aged 52–53	Left no children. After his death, Geisingen returned to Fürstenberg.
In 1483 Geisingen rejoined Fürstenberg
Henry VII	1464; First son of Conrad II and Kunigunde of Matsch	24 April 1484 – 22 July 1499	County of Fürstenberg	Unmarried	22 July 1499; Dornach aged 34–35	Children of Conrad II, ruled jointly.
Wolfgang	1/3 April 1465; Second son of Conrad II and Kunigunde of Matsch	24 April 1484 – 31 December 1509	County of Fürstenberg	Elisabeth of Solms-Braunfels (21 October 1469 - 24 August 1540); 1488 six children	31 December 1509; Ortenberg aged 43–44	Children of Conrad II, ruled jointly.
William I	7 January 1491; First son of Wolfgang and Elisabeth of Solms-Braunfels	31 December 1509 – 21 August 1549	County of Fürstenberg	Bonne of Neufchâtel-Bourgogne (1480-19 May 1515); 22 October 1505 no children	21 August 1549; Ortenberg aged 57–58	Children of Wolfgang, ruled jointly.
Frederick II	19 June 1496; Wolfach; Second son of Wolfgang and Elisabeth of Solms-Braunfels	31 December 1509 – 8 March 1559	County of Fürstenberg	Anna of Werdenberg-Trochtelfingen (1500-1554); 19 February 1516; Ortenberg sixteen children	8 March 1559; Betenbrunn aged 62	Children of Wolfgang, ruled jointly.
Christoph I	24 August 1534; Sixth son of Frederick II and Anna of Werdenberg-Trochtelfingen	8 March – 17 August 1559	County of Fürstenberg (at Blumberg)	Barbara of Montfort-Tettnang (d.2 December 1592); 2/6 January 1556; Tettnang two children	17 August 1559; Heiligenberg aged 24	Children of Frederick II, divided their inheritance.
Henry VIII	19 September 1536; Seventh son of Frederick II and Anna of Werdenberg-Trochtelfingen	8 March 1559 – 12 October 1596	County of Fürstenberg (at Baar)	Amalia of Solms-Lich (10 December 1537 - 18 June 1593); 1 April 1560; Lich one child	12 October 1596; Heiligenberg aged 60	Children of Frederick II, divided their inheritance.
Joachim	25 January 1538; Eighth son of Frederick II and Anna of Werdenberg-Trochtelfingen	8 March 1559 – 21 October 1598	County of Heiligenberg	Anna of Zimmern-Messkirch (1545-1601); 9 February 1562 fifteen children	21 October 1598; Heiligenberg aged 60	Children of Frederick II, divided their inheritance.
In 1496 Baar rejoined Blumberg, reuniting the main line of Fürstenberg
Regency of Barbara of Montfort-Tettnang (1559-1569)						
Albert I	15 March 1557; Son of Christoph I and Barbara of Montfort-Tettnang	17 August 1559 – 13 September 1599	County of Fürstenberg (at Blumberg; also in Baar since 1596))	Elisabeth of Pernstein (6 November 1557 - 31 August 1610); 31 August 1578; Prague thirteen children	13 September 1599; Prague aged 42	
Frederick III	9 May 1563; Son of Joachim and Anna of Zimmern-Messkirch	21 October 1598 – 8 August 1617	County of Heiligenberg	Elisabeth of Sulz (9 March 1563 - 24 April 1601); 10 September 1584 six children	8 August 1617; Dresden aged 54	
Christoph II	16 November 1580; Blumberg; First son of Albert I and Elisabeth of Pernstein	13 September 1599 – 5 January 1614	County of Fürstenberg	Dorothea of Sternberg (1570-12 June 1633); 1600 six children	5 January 1614 aged 33	Children of Albert, divided their inheritance. Christoph died in a conflict with his cousin, the future Count William II of Heiligenberg.
Wratislaus I	31 January 1584; Prague; Second son of Albert I and Elisabeth of Pernstein	13 September 1599 – 10 July 1631	County of Möhringen	Marguerite de Croy (11 October 1568 - 1614)16 July 1609 no children Catharina Livia de la Vierda Tierra (d.1 July 1627); 7 March 1615 no children Lavinia Gonzaga of Novellara (14 October 1607 - 7 May 1639); 17 December 1628 two children	10 July 1631; Vienna aged 47	Children of Albert, divided their inheritance. Christoph died in a conflict with his cousin, the future Count William II of Heiligenberg.
Wratislaus II	1600; First son of Christoph II and Dorothea of Sternberg	5 January 1614 – 27 May 1642	County of Messkirch	Joanna Eleonora of Helfenstein-Gundelfingen (d.1629); 1622 five children Franziska Carolina of Helfenstein-Wiesensteig (d.1641); 1636 three children	27 May 1642 aged 41–42	Children of Christoph II, divided the county of Fürstenberg.
Frederick Rudolph	23 April 1602; Blumberg; Second son of Christoph II and Dorothea of Sternberg	5 January 1614 – 25 October 1655	County of Stühlingen	Maria Maximiliana of Pappenheim (d.1635); 27 February 1631 two children Anna Magdalena of Hanau-Lichtenberg; 8 April 1636 five children	25 October 1655; Datschitz aged 53	Children of Christoph II, divided the county of Fürstenberg.
William II	1586; First son of Frederick III and Elisabeth of Sulz	8 August 1617 – 1618	County of Heiligenberg	Polyxena Anna Benigna Popel of Lobkowicz (d.1646) no children	1618 aged 31–32	Children of Frederick IV; divided their inheritance.
Egon (VIII)	21 March 1588; Speyer; Second son of Frederick III and Elisabeth of Sulz	8 August 1617 – 24 August 1635	County of Heiligenberg	Anna Maria of Hohenzollern-Hechingen (8 September 1603 - 23 August 1652); 9 June 1619; Hechingen ten children	24 August 1635; Konstanz aged 47	Children of Frederick IV; divided their inheritance.
James Louis	1592; Fourth son of Frederick III and Elisabeth of Sulz	8 August 1617 – 15 November 1627	County of Heiligenberg (at Donaueschingen)	Eleonore of Schwendi (2 November 1599 - 17 February 1667); 3 October 1612 ten children	15 November 1627 aged 34–35	Children of Frederick IV; divided their inheritance.
Regency of Eleonore of Schwendi (1627-1640)						Left no descendants. After his death Donaueschingen rejoined Heiligenberg.
Francis Charles	25 March 1626; Son of James Louis and Eleonore of Schwendi	15 November 1627 – 19 July 1682	County of Heiligenberg (at Donaueschingen)	Unmarried	19 July 1682 aged 56	Left no descendants. After his death Donaueschingen rejoined Heiligenberg.
In 1682 Donaueschingen was annexed to Heiligenberg
Albert II	1616; Son of Wratislaus I and Catharina Livia de la Vierda Tierra	10 July 1631 – 18 October 1640	County of Möhringen	Unmarried	18 October 1640 aged 23–24	Left no descendants. He was succeeded by his infant brother.
Herman Egon	5 November 1627; Heiligenberg; Fourth son of Egon (VIII) and Anna Maria of Hohenzollern-Hechingen	24 August 1635 – 22 September 1674	County of Heiligenberg (until 1664) Principality of Heiligenberg (until 1664)	Maria Franziska of Fürstenberg-Stühlingen (7 August 1638 - 24 August 1680); 11 July 1655; Stühlingen eight children	22 September 1674; Munich aged 46	Children of Egon (VIII), ruled jointly.
Ferdinand Frederick	6 February 1623; Heiligenberg; First son of Egon (VIII) and Anna Maria of Hohenzollern-Hechingen	24 August 1635 – 28 August 1662	County of Heiligenberg	Unmarried	28 August 1662 aged 39	Children of Egon (VIII), ruled jointly.
Ernest Egon	21 May 1631; Heiligenberg; Sixth son of Egon (VIII) and Anna Maria of Hohenzollern-Hechingen	24 August 1635 – 4 May 1652	County of Heiligenberg	Unmarried	4 May 1652; Étampes aged 20	Children of Egon (VIII), ruled jointly.
Regency of Lavinia Gonzaga of Novellara (1640-1641)						After his premature death, Möhringen was annexed to Stühlingen.
Francis Wratislaus	18 November 1631; Son of Wratislaus I and Lavinia Gonzaga of Novellara	18 October 1640 – 13 January 1641	County of Möhringen	Unmarried	13 January 1641 aged 9	After his premature death, Möhringen was annexed to Stühlingen.
In 1641 Möhringen was annexed to Stühlingen
Francis Christoph	28 July 1625; Blumberg; Son of Wratislaus II and Joanna Eleonora of Helfenstein-Gundelfingen	27 May 1642 – 22 September 1671	County of Messkirch	Maria Theresa of Arenberg (2 April 1639 - 18 January 1705); 4 January 1660; Brussels eight children	22 September 1671; Hüfingen aged 46	
Maximilian Francis	12 May 1634; Blumberg; Son of Frederick Rudolph and Maria Maximiliana of Pappenheim	25 October 1655 – 24 October 1681	County of Stühlingen	Maria Magdalena of Bernhausen (d.1702); 15 May 1656 sevenchildren	24 October 1681; Strasbourg aged 47	
Regency of Maria Theresa of Arenberg and Froben Maria of Fürstenberg-Messkirch (1671-1685)						
Froben Ferdinand	6 August 1664; Meßkirch; Son of Francis Christoph and Maria Theresa of Arenberg	22 September 1671 – 4 April 1741	County of Messkirch	Maria Theresa Felicitas of Sulz (12 March 1671 – 26 March 1743); 5 June 1690; Jestetten four children	4 April 1741; Meßkirch aged 77	
Anton Egon	23 April 1656; Munich; Son of Herman Egon and Maria Franziska of Fürstenberg-Stühlingen	22 September 1674 – 10 October 1716	Principality of Heiligenberg	Marie de Ligny (1656-18 August 1711); 11 January 1677; Paris four children	10 October 1716; Wermsdorf aged 60	Left no male descendants. After his death, the principality was annexed to Stühlingen.
In 1716 Heiligenberg was annexed to Stühlingen
Prosper Ferdinand	12 September 1662; Stühlingen; Son of Maximilian Francis and Maria Magdalena of Bernhausen	24 October 1681 – 21 November 1704	County of Stühlingen	Sophia Eusebia of Königsegg-Rothenfels (23 July 1674 - 17 January 1731); 30 November 1690; Vienna eightchildren	21 November 1704; Landau aged 53	
Regency of Anton Egon, Prince of Fürstenberg-Heiligenberg (1704-1710)						In 1716, Joseph William Ernest inherited his uncle's estates in Heiligenberg, and shortly after his lands were elevated to a Principality. The complete reunion took place in 1744, with the annexation of Messkirch, but in that same year, he split a part of his territories in Weitra and gave them to his brother Louis August.
Joseph William Ernest	13 April 1699; Augsburg; First son of Prosper Ferdinand and Sophia Eusebia of Königsegg-Rothenfels	21 November 1704 – 2 December 1716	County of Stühlingen	Maria Anna of Waldstein-Wartenberg (22 February 1707 - 12 November 1756); 6 June 1723 eight children Maria Anna von Wahl (22 September 1736 - 21 March 1808); 4 January 1761 no children	29 April 1762; Vienna aged 63	In 1716, Joseph William Ernest inherited his uncle's estates in Heiligenberg, and shortly after his lands were elevated to a Principality. The complete reunion took place in 1744, with the annexation of Messkirch, but in that same year, he split a part of his territories in Weitra and gave them to his brother Louis August.
Joseph William Ernest	13 April 1699; Augsburg; First son of Prosper Ferdinand and Sophia Eusebia of Königsegg-Rothenfels	2 December 1716 – 29 April 1762	Principality of Fürstenberg	Maria Anna of Waldstein-Wartenberg (22 February 1707 - 12 November 1756); 6 June 1723 eight children Maria Anna von Wahl (22 September 1736 - 21 March 1808); 4 January 1761 no children	29 April 1762; Vienna aged 63	In 1716, Joseph William Ernest inherited his uncle's estates in Heiligenberg, and shortly after his lands were elevated to a Principality. The complete reunion took place in 1744, with the annexation of Messkirch, but in that same year, he split a part of his territories in Weitra and gave them to his brother Louis August.
Louis August	4 February 1705; Aschaffenburg; Second son of Prosper Ferdinand and Sophia Eusebia of Königsegg-Rothenfels	1744 – 10 November 1759	County of Weitra	Maria Anna Josepha Fugger (21 May 1719 - 11 January 1784); 8 November 1745; Hohen-Altheim three children	10 November 1759; Linz aged 54	In 1716, Joseph William Ernest inherited his uncle's estates in Heiligenberg, and shortly after his lands were elevated to a Principality. The complete reunion took place in 1744, with the annexation of Messkirch, but in that same year, he split a part of his territories in Weitra and gave them to his brother Louis August.
Charles Frederick	9 August 1714; Meßkirch; Son of Froben Ferdinand and Maria Theresa Felicitas of Sulz	4 April 1741 – 7 September 1744	County of Messkirch	Maria Gabriella Felicitas of Schleswig-Holstein-Sonderburg-Wiesenburg (22 October 1716 - 13 June 1798); 23 May 1735; Wetzdorf no children	7 September 1744; Hüfingen aged 30	Left no descendants. After his death Messkirch was annexed to recently re-formed Fürstenberg.
In 1744 Messkirch was annexed to Fürstenberg
Regency of Maria Anna Josepha Fugger (1759-1763)						Children of Louis August, divided their inheritance. In 1806 they had their estates mediatized after the German mediatisation.
Joachim Egon	22 December 1749; Ludwigsburg; First son of Louis August and Maria Anna Josepha Fugger	10 November 1759 – 6 August 1806	County of Weitra	Sophia Maria of Oettingen-Wallerstein (9 December 1751 - 21 May 1835); 18 August 1772; Wallerstein eight children	26 January 1828; Vienna aged 78	Children of Louis August, divided their inheritance. In 1806 they had their estates mediatized after the German mediatisation.
Charles Frederick	24 February 1751; Ludwigsburg; Second son of Louis August and Maria Anna Josepha Fugger	10 November 1759 – 6 August 1806	County of Weitra (at Taikowitz)	Maria Josepha of Schallenberg (8 August 1748 - 10 June 1783); 20 February 1776 three children Johanna of Zirotin-Lilgenau (12 February 1771 - 20 November 1785); 12 May 1784 seven children	1 July 1814; Valašské Meziříčí aged 63	Children of Louis August, divided their inheritance. In 1806 they had their estates mediatized after the German mediatisation.
In 1806 Weitra and Taikowitz were mediatised to Austria
Joseph Wenceslaus	21 March 1728; Prague; Son of Joseph William Ernest and Maria Anna of Waldstein-Wartenberg	29 April 1762 – 2 June 1783	Principality of Fürstenberg	Maria Josepha of Waldburg-Scheer-Trauchburg (30 March 1731 - 7 May 1782); 9 June 1748 six children	2 June 1783; Donaueschingen aged 55	Children of Joseph William Ernest, divided their inheritance.
Charles Egon I	7 May 1729; Prague; Second son of Joseph William Ernest and Maria Anna of Waldstein-Wartenberg	29 April 1762 – 11 July 1786	Principality of Pürglitz	Maria Josepha of Sternberg (24 June 1735 - 16 January 1803); 25 June 1753 nine children	11 July 1786; Prague aged 57	Children of Joseph William Ernest, divided their inheritance.
Joseph Maria	9 January 1758; Donaueschingen; Second son of Joseph Wenceslaus and Maria Josepha of Waldburg-Scheer-Trauchburg	2 June 1783 – 24 June 1796	Principality of Fürstenberg	Maria Antonia of Hohenzollern-Hechingen; 15 January 1778; Hechingen no children	24 June 1796; Donaueschingen aged 38	
Philip Maria	21 October 1755; Prague; Son of Charles Egon I and Maria Josepha of Sternberg	11 July 1786 – 5 June 1790	Principality of Pürglitz	Josepha Joanna Benedicta of Fürstenberg (14 November 1756 - 2 October 1809); 1779; Donaueschingen three children	13 December 1799; Prague aged 14	
Regency of Josepha Joanna Benedicta of Fürstenberg (1790-1799)						Left no descendants. He was succeeded by his cousin, Charles Egon.
Charles Gabriel	2 February 1785; Prague; Son of Philip Maria and Josepha Joanna Benedicta of Fürstenberg	5 June 1790 – 13 December 1799	Principality of Pürglitz	Unmarried	13 December 1799; Prague aged 14	Left no descendants. He was succeeded by his cousin, Charles Egon.
Charles Joachim	31 March 1771; Donaueschingen; Fifth son of Joseph Wenceslaus and Maria Josepha of Waldburg-Scheer-Trauchburg	24 June 1796 – 17 May 1804	Principality of Fürstenberg	Carolina Sophia of Fürstenberg-Weitra (20 August 1777 - 25 February 1846); 11 January 1796; Vienna no children	17 May 1804; Donaueschingen aged 33	
Regency of Elisabeth of Thurn and Taxis (1799-1806)						Son of Charles Alois, brother of Philip Maria, Prince of Pürglitz. In 1804 became sole heir of the main Principality of Fürstenberg, only for it to be mediatised in 1806, all during his minority.
Charles Egon II	28 October 1796; Prague; Son of Charles Alois of Fürstenberg-Pürglitz and Elisabeth of Thurn and Taxis	13 December 1799 – 17 May 1804	Principality of Pürglitz	Amalie of Baden; 19 April 1818 seven children	22 October 1854; Bad Ischl aged 57	Son of Charles Alois, brother of Philip Maria, Prince of Pürglitz. In 1804 became sole heir of the main Principality of Fürstenberg, only for it to be mediatised in 1806, all during his minority.
Charles Egon II	28 October 1796; Prague; Son of Charles Alois of Fürstenberg-Pürglitz and Elisabeth of Thurn and Taxis	17 May 1804 – 6 August 1806	Principality of Fürstenberg	Amalie of Baden; 19 April 1818 seven children	22 October 1854; Bad Ischl aged 57	Son of Charles Alois, brother of Philip Maria, Prince of Pürglitz. In 1804 became sole heir of the main Principality of Fürstenberg, only for it to be mediatised in 1806, all during his minority.
In 1806 Fürstenberg and Pürglitz were mediatised between Baden, Württemberg and Hohenzollern-Sigmaringen

== Post-1806 lines of succession ==
=== Mediatized line of Weitra ===
- Joachim Egon (Ruling until 1806; non-ruling 1806–1828)
- Frederick Egon (1828–1856)
- John Nepomuk Joachim Egon (1856–1879)
- Eduard Egon (1879–1932)

Weitra line extinct, possessions fell back to Prince Maximilian Egon II as head of the House of Fürstenberg.

=== Mediatized line of Taikowitz ===
- Friedrich Joseph Maximilian Augustus (1759-1814; Ruling until 1806, non-ruling 1806-1814)
  - Joseph Friedrich Franz de Paula Vincenz (1777-1840; 1814-1840)
  - Friedrich Michael Johann Joseph (1793-1866; 1840-1866), the last landgrave of this line and official guardian of Bertha von Suttner

=== Mediatized line of Pürglitz ===
- Karl Egon II, 5th Prince 1806-1854 (1796-1854)
  - Karl Egon III, 6th Prince 1854-1892 (1820-1892)
    - Karl Egon IV, 7th Prince 1892-1896 (1852-1896)
  - Prince Maximilian Egon I of Furstenberg-Pürglitz (1822-1873)
    - Maximilian Egon II, 8th Prince 1896-1941 (1863-1941)
      - Karl Egon V, 9th Prince 1941-1973 (1891-1973), also Landgrave of Fürstenberg-Weitra
      - Prince Maximilian Egon of Fürstenberg (1896-1959)
        - Joachim Egon, 10th Prince 1973-2002 (1923-2002)
          - Heinrich, 11th Prince 2002-2024 (1950-2024)
            - Christian, Prince of Fürstenberg 12th Prince 2024–present (born 1977)
            - Prince Antonius of Fürstenberg (born 1985)
          - Prince Karl Egon of Fürstenberg (born 1953)
          - Prince Johannes of Fürstenberg-Weitra (born 1958), adopted by Karl Egon V and inherited the Landgraviate of Fürstenberg-Weitra in 1973
            - Prince Vincenz of Fürstenberg-Weitra (born 1985)
            - Prince Ludwig of Fürstenberg-Weitra (born 1997)
            - Prince Johann Christian of Fürstenberg-Weitra (born 1999)
        - Prince Friedrich Maximilian of Fürstenberg (1926-1969)
          - Prince Maximilian of Fürstenberg (born 1962)
            - Prince Friedrich Götz of Fürstenberg (born 1995)
