= Colombischlössle Freiburg =

Manor house in Freiburg im Breisgau, Germany

Coordinates: 47°59′52″N 7°50′46″E

Colombischlössle
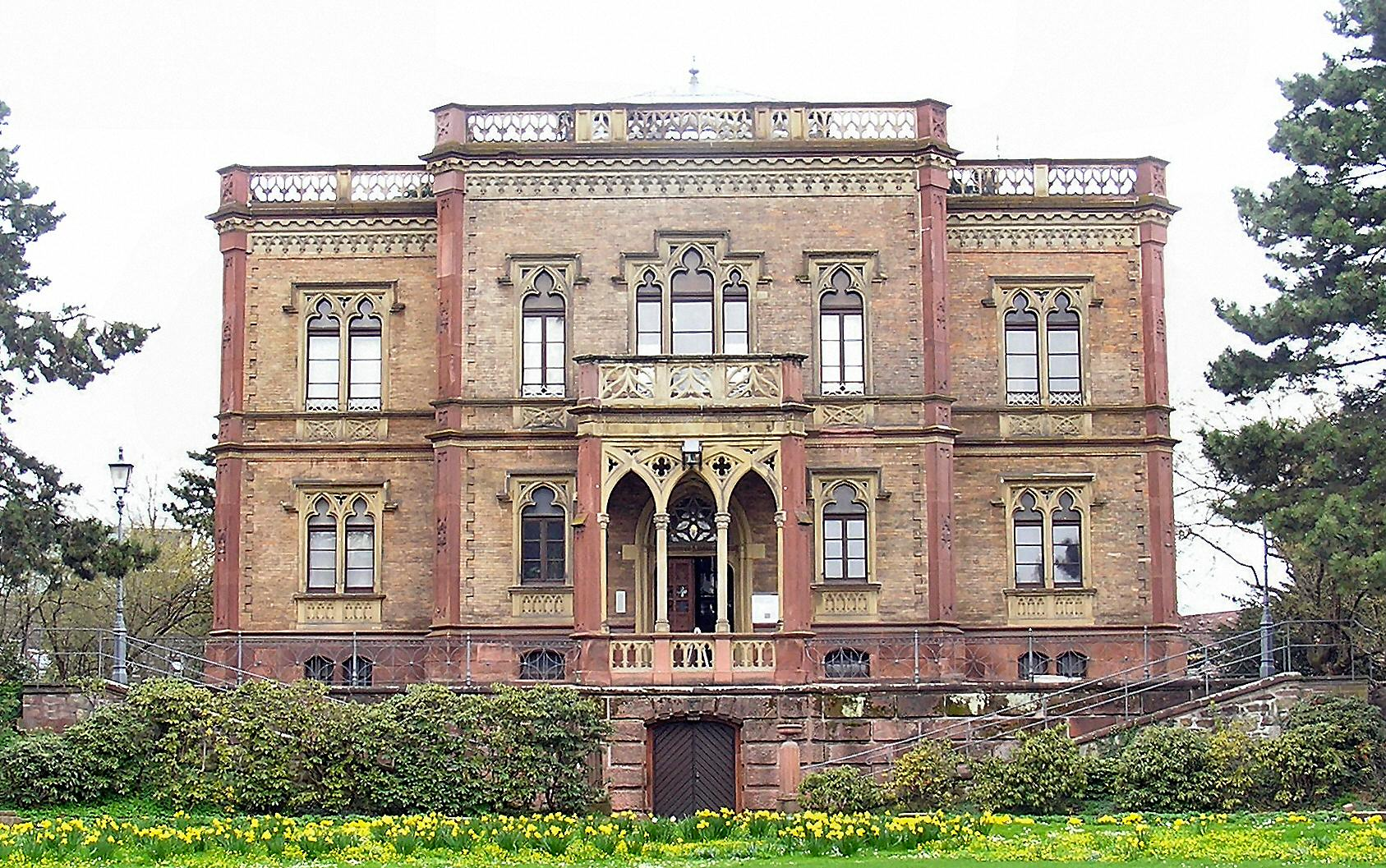
- Interactive map of the Colombischlössle area

General information
- Architectural style: Gothic Tudor
- Location: Rotteckring 5, Freiburg im Breisgau
- Year built: 1859–1861
- Cost: 300,000 Goldmark

Technical details
- Floor count: 2

Design and construction
- Architect: Georg Jakob Schneider
- Designations: National Heritage Site (2003)

Other information
- Public transit access: Tram line 5

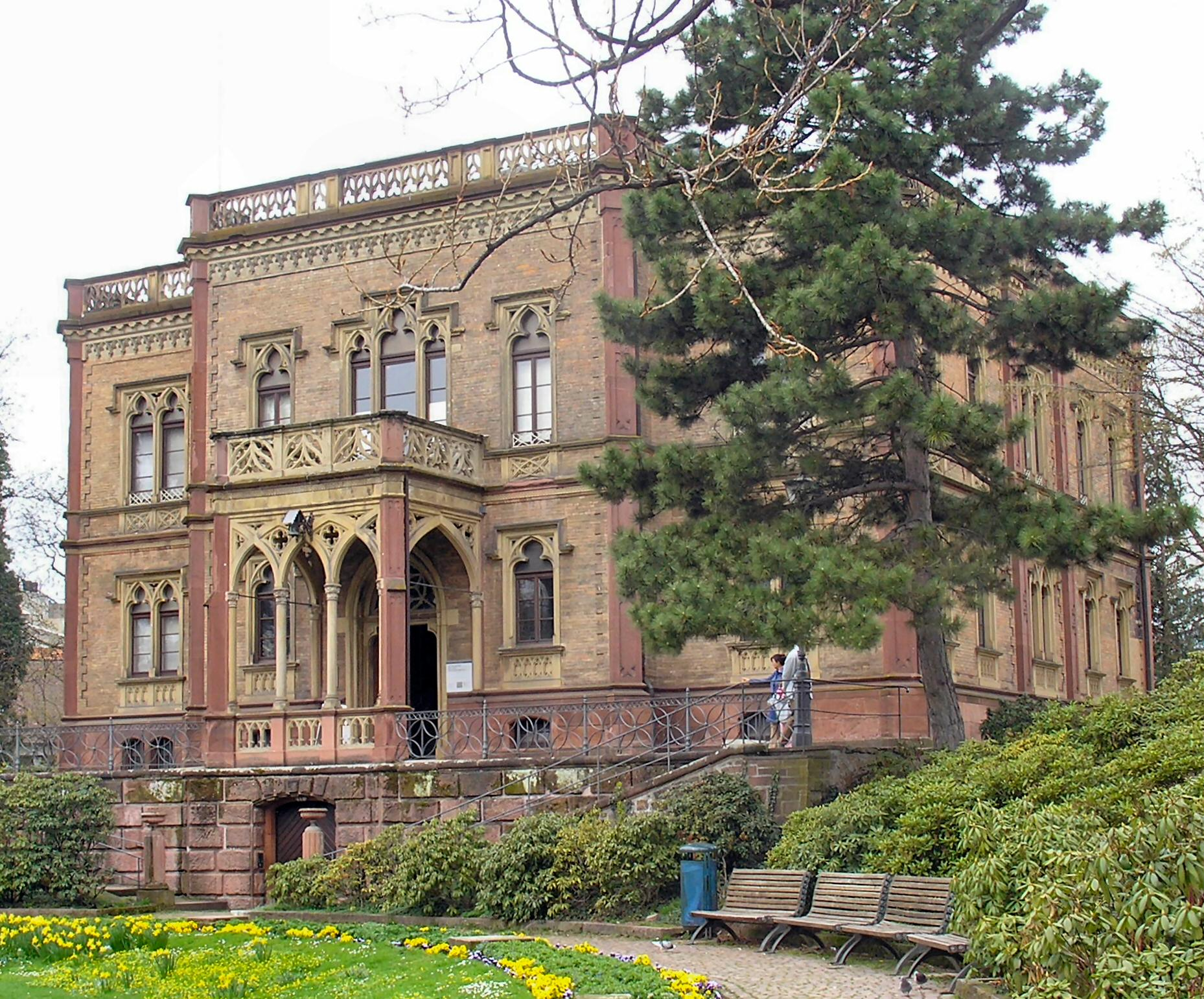
Side view

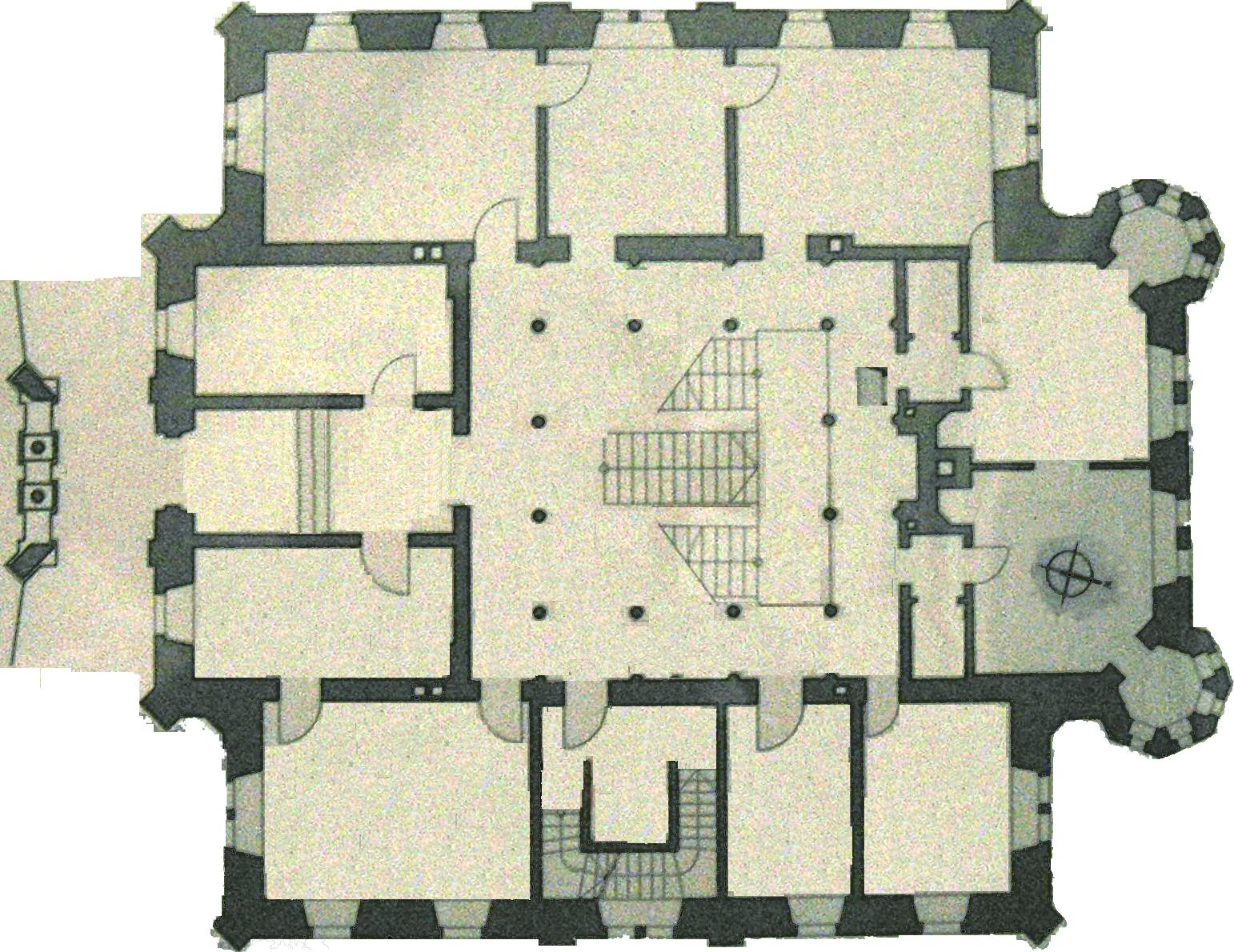
Floorplan

The Colombischlössle is a manor house in the city centre of Freiburg im Breisgau where the eponymous archaeological museum is situated.

== Building ==
The "Colombischlössle" (Colombi castle) was built between 1859 and 1861 on the terrain of the former bastion Saint Louis of the town fortification of Freiburg, which had been filled in 15 metres and converted to a garden. Duches Maria Antonia Gertrudis von Zea Bermudez y Colombi was the one who commissioned the castle. She wanted the building to be her widow's residence. The plans were made by the Freiburg architect Georg Jakob Schneider, who chose the gothic Tudor-style of the English medieval times as inspiration for the historicist mansion. Additionally, he was inspired by his teacher, Friedrich Eisenlohr, who had rebuilt Ortenberg Castle in this style. It cost about 300,000 Goldmark, 750 per square metre. The historic stairwell, the parquet flooring and a light glass cupola roof, still show the former prosperity of the duchess Maria Antonia Gertrudis de Colombi y de Bode (1809–1863).

Johann Georg Thoma, a manufacturer from Todtnau, acquired the estate from the inheritors and converted part of it into building terrain. Around this time, the Colombi street and Rosa street, which was named after his wife, were formed here. In 1899, the city of Freiburg purchased the building. It served as the urban art museum from 1909 to 1923, and later as an office building. Additionally, the Badian association "Badische Heimat" had an office here, as their secretary, Max Wingenroth (1872–1922), was the head of the town's collections. From 1947 to 1952, the Colombischlössle was the location of the "Staatskanzlei", the regional government of Baden under Leo Wohleb. Since it was renovated in 1983, the "Archäologische Museum Colombischlössle" (archaeological museum Colomischlössle) has its home in the Colombischlössle.

The Colombischlössle and its park have been designated as a national heritage site since 2003. The museum was closed due to remediation work from May to September in 2014. During this time, the historical glass roof was resealed and the walls on the ground floor were repainted.

== Park ==
The park of the Colombischlössle was designed in the style of an English landscape garden with exotic plants and trees as well as a fountain. It was completed in 1860 and is open to the public since 1906. In 1955, the park was appointed a natural monument. Opposite to it, the Colombi Hotel was opened in the middle of May 1957. Before the decrease in size due to the expansion of the Rotteckring in 1962, the park covered an area of 1.5 hectare and today it covers an area of 1.3 hectare. Today, the park is used for art exhibitions as well as cultural programmes and it includes a vineyard trail. Alongside a female statue there is the Schneckenreiter Fountain. Its statue was designed by Konrad Taucher (1873–1950), a sculptor from Karlsruhe, and cast by the company Paul Stotz in Stuttgart. The Münsterbauverein in Freiburg purchased the art piece at the anniversary exhibition for arts and applied arts in Karlsuhe and handed it over to the city.

A 1978 steel sculpture by Manfred Dörner was installed in the south-eastern part of the park in 2006. The sculpture originally stood in a row of chestnut trees in front of the Black Monastery.

- Schneckenreiter Fountain (Konrad Taucher, 1906)
- Steel Sculpture (Manfred Dörner, 1978)
- Statue of a Woman

The park has been used as a cruising area by the gay scene. Not least because of its proximity to the central station it is a hot spot of the drug scene in Freiburg. Despite residents seeking legal action at the Freiburg administrative court, a space to safely take drugs was opened in the Rosastrasse. From 1998 to 2014 from November to January there was a Spiegeltent above the fountain in front of the schlössle, serving as the venue for dinner theatre every night, featuring a variety show.

In 2017, residents founded an initiative to revitalise the park which had acquired a bad reputation due to muggings. Among other measures, it was planned to demolish a one-metre-high (3.3 ft) wall on the east side of the park and replace it with an only half as high wall for sitting and resting. The lawn is supposed to be reshaped and is intended for people to rest on. These constructions are supposed to be finished by the end of 2017. The construction on the Rotteckring as part of the tram construction works are set to be finished by mid-2018.

== Bibliography ==
- Joseph L. Wohleb: Aus der Geschichte des Colombischlößles und der Familie Colombi. In: Schau-ins-Land 70, 1951/52, S. 100–119 (Digitalisat).
- William von Schröder: Neue Kunde über die Besitzer des Freiburger Colombi-Schlößles. In: Schau-ins-Land 73, 1955, S. 122–128 (Digitalisat).
- Gitta Reinhardt-Fehrenbach: Denkmalporträt: Quo vadis Colombi-Schlössle? In: Denkmalpflege in Baden-Württemberg. Nachrichtenblatt des Landesdenkmalamtes, 3/2003, S. 275–276 (Digitalisat).
- Hilde Hiller: 20 Jahre Museum für Ur- und Frühgeschichte im Colombischlössle. Museum für Ur- und Frühgeschichte, Freiburg, (Breisgau) 2003.
- Ulrike Kalbaum: Die Villa Colombi in Freiburg im Breisgau (1859–1861). Studien zum neugotischen Wohnbau in Südwestdeutschland. Alber, Freiburg/München 2006, ISBN 978-3-495-49951-1.
- drogenhilfe-freiburg-online.de: Drogenhilfe Freiburg - Die Einrichtungen, Retrieved 23 July 2011
- Holger Schindler und Joachim Röderer: Freiburg: Dinnershow: Teatro Colombino in Freiburg steht vor dem Aus. Badische Zeitung, 9 July 2015, retrieved 29 September 2016.
