= Ortenberg =

Ortenberg may refer to several places in Germany:

- Ortenberg, Hesse
- Ortenberg, Baden-Württemberg
- Ortenberg Castle, near Ortenberg, Baden-Württemberg
- Ortenberg (mountain), Baden-Württemberg
