= Fürstenberg-Wolfach =

European polity

Fürstenberg-Wolfach was a county in western Baden-Württemberg, Germany during the Middle Ages. It occupied a region surrounding Wolfach. It was created as a partition of the Principality of Fürstenberg in 1408. With the extinction of its line of the Fürstenbergers in 1490, it was inherited by the Counts of Fürstenberg-Baar.

== Counts of Fürstenberg-Wolfach (1408–1490) ==
- Conrad IV (1408–1419) likely died sometime before October 1419.
- Henry VIII the Noble (1419–1490), son of Conrad IV and Adelheid, succeeded his father as count at the age of five. He remained unmarried for his entire life.
