= Colombi Hotel =

Luxury hotel in Freiburg, Germany

Coordinates: 47.99694976377844°N 7.84778852685585°E

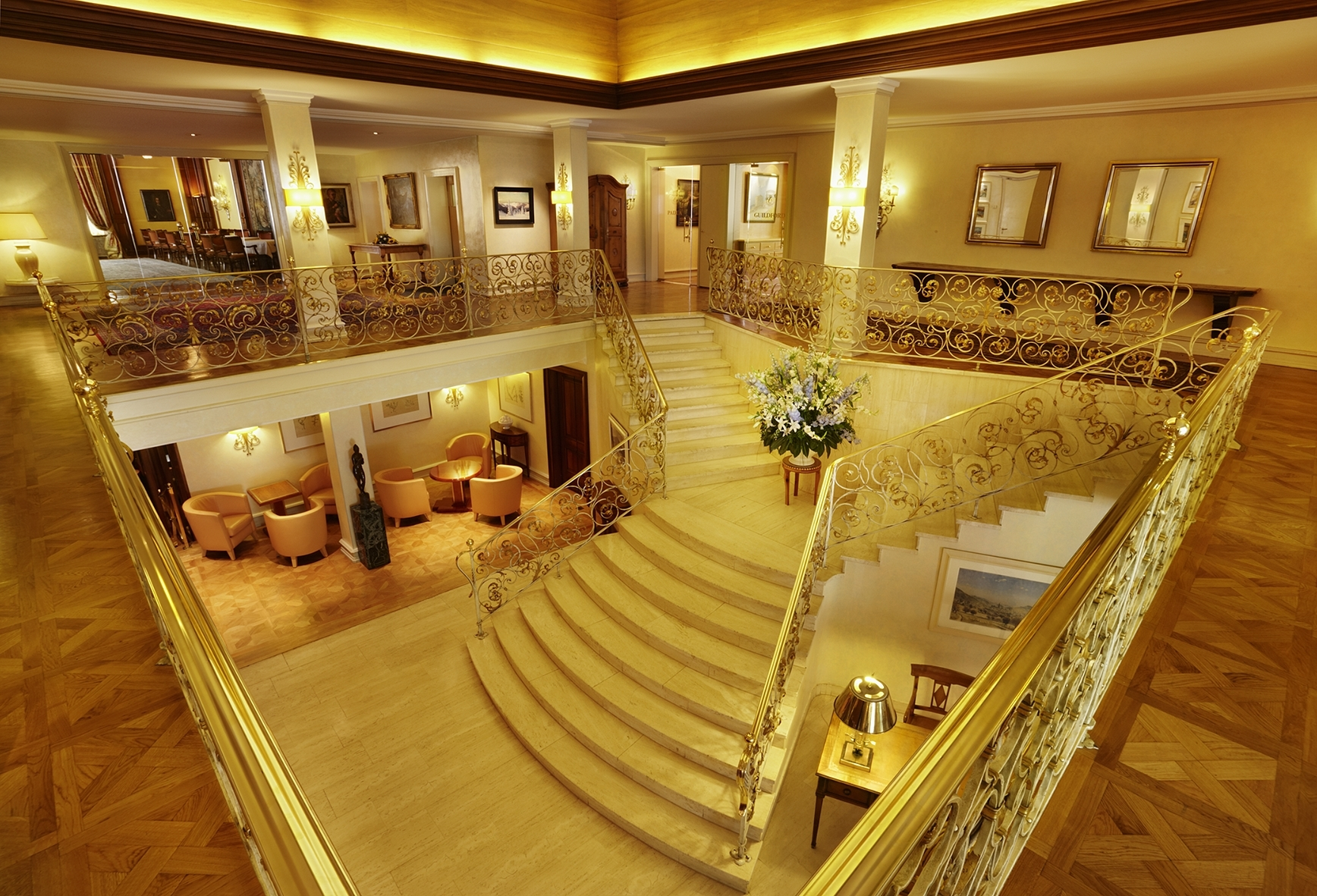
Staircase inside Colombi Hotel

Colombi Hotel is a luxury hotel in Freiburg im Breisgau, Germany. The hotel is located in the city center of Freiburg, on the Rotteckring, opposite the Colombipark and its Colombischlössle, from which the hotel got its name.

Since 1995, Colombi Hotel has been a member of the alliance "The Leading Hotels of the World". The adjoining gourmet restaurant Zirbelstube has been awarded a Michelin star every year since 1983.

In 2011, some scenes of the TV show "Make me happy" with Heinz Hoenig were filmed in the Colombi Hotel. In the George Roy Hill film "The Dragonfly" (1984), the Colombi Hotel was one of the filming locations.

== History ==
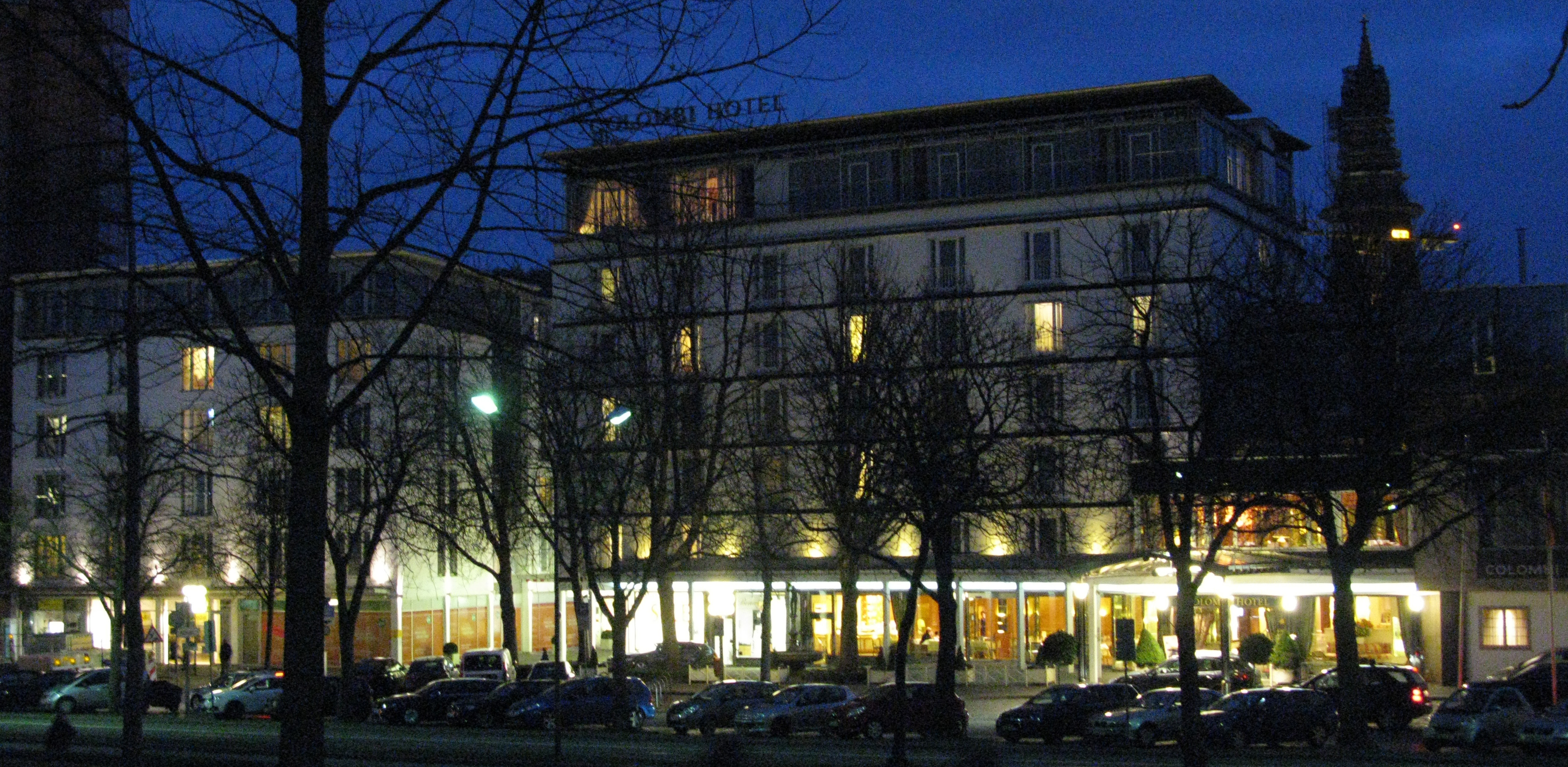
The hotel from the Colombipark

The hotel was opened in June 1957. On the occasion of the 500th anniversary of the University of Freiburg, prominent guests from politics and business were welcomed in the same year. Saudi Arabian King Saud bin Abdulaziz Al Saud and his entourage spent several days at the Colombi Hotel in 1959.
