= Egino IV, Count of Urach =

Egino IV the Bearded
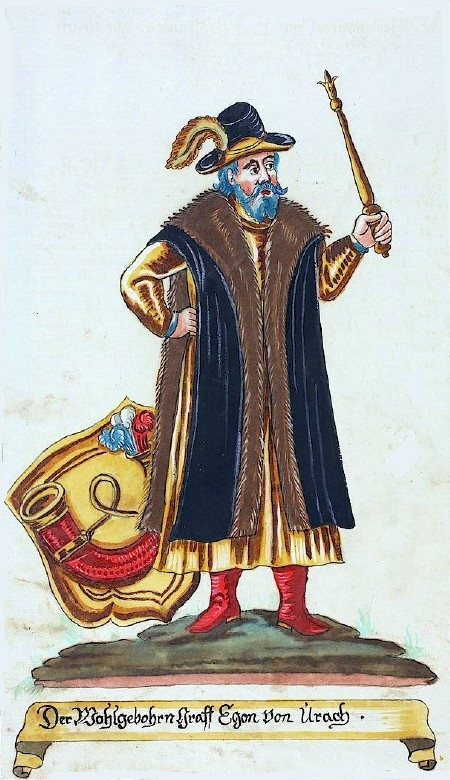

Count of Urach
- Reign: 1181–1230
- Predecessor: Egino III, Count of Urach
- Successor: Egino I, Count of Freiburg
- Born: c. 1160; Bad Urach, Holy Roman Empire
- Died: 12 January 1230; Tennenbach Abbey
- Spouse: Agnes von Zähringen
- House: House of Urach
- Father: Egino III, Count of Urach

Egino IV (German: Egino der Bärtige; c. 1160 – 12 January 1230), also written as Egeno or Egon, and called the Bearded, was Count of Urach from 1181 to 1230 and co-ruler of the County of Frieburg with his son Egino V from 1218 to 1230.

== Biography ==
Egino IV was married to Agnes von Zähringen, daughter of Berthold V, Duke of Zähringen, and inherited his lands east of the Rhine after the extinction of the male line of the House of Zähringen in 1218. The scale of this inheritance was subject to dispute, however, with claimants from the Dukes of Teck and the house of Baden-Hachburg voicing their discontent, which led to intervention by Holy Roman Emperor Frederick II, who decided to divide the land, reverting some to the crown, dividing the rest between the claimants and Egino IV. Discontent with this agreement, Egino would go to war, which ended in a peace at Ulm in which more generous terms were given to him. He would hold Freiburg, Neuchâtel, Villingen, and Offenburg, among others as a result of this agreement.

He would die in 1218, and be succeeded by his son, Egino V, known as 'the Younger', who would style himself Egino I, Count of Freiburg.

His second son Conrad of Urach was a Cistercian monk and abbot, who would become Cardinal Bishop of Porto and Santa Rufina, and in 1226 was offered the Papacy, however, he refused.
