= Fürstenberg Castle (Hüfingen) =

Castle in Baden-Württemberg, Germany

Coordinates: 47°53′26.5″N 8°33′36.4″E

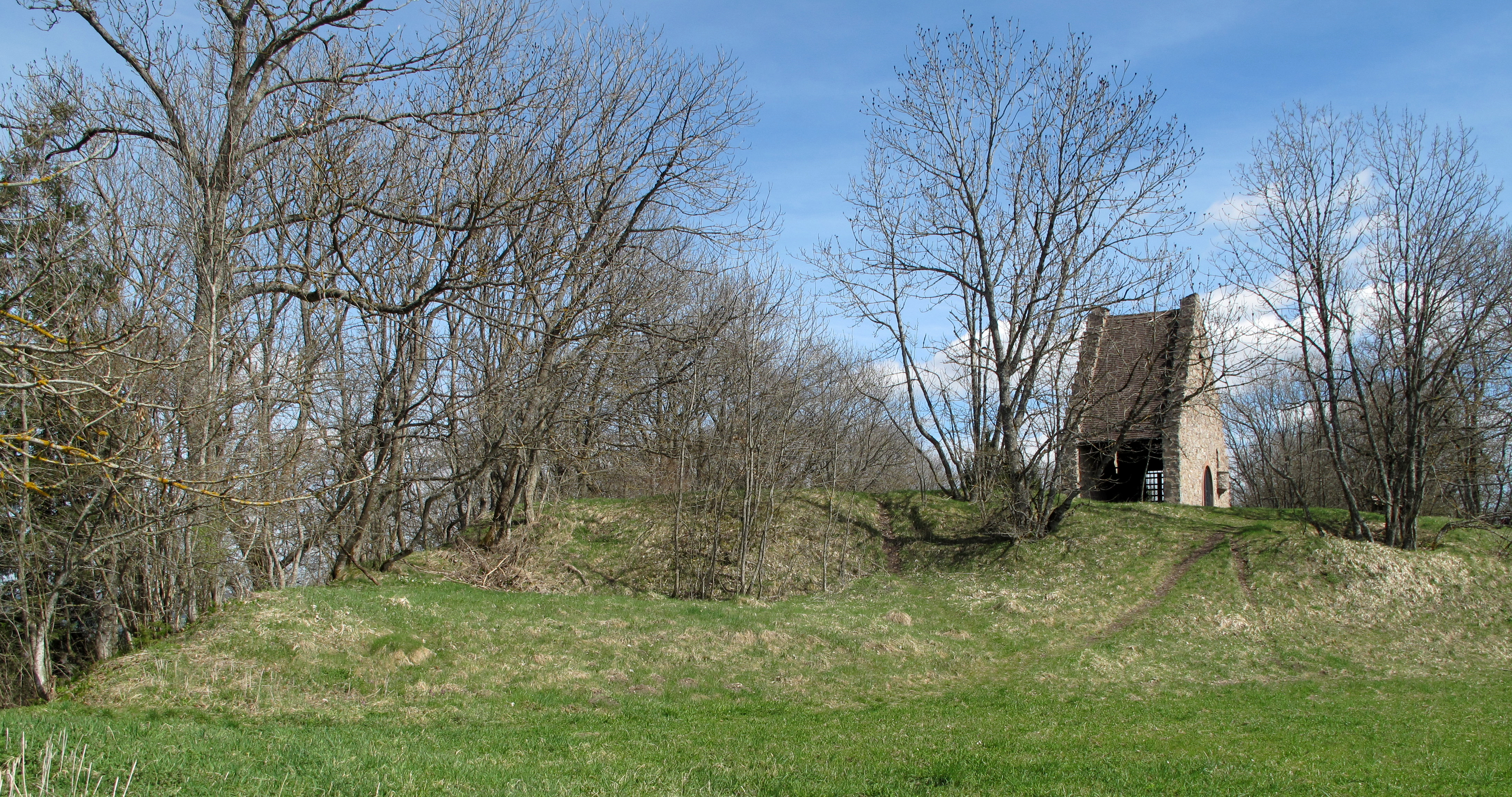
Fürstenberg Castle

Fürstenberg Castle (German: Burg Fürstenberg or simply Fürstenberg, literally "Prince's Hill") is a castle in Baden-Württemberg, Germany. It is located on the Fürstenberg hill in the Baar region, near the town of Hüfingen.

The castle was first mentioned in a deed of 1175 as a possession of the House of Zähringen, which became extinct with the death of Duke Berthold V. Around 1250, his heir Count Henry of Urach made it his residence and thereafter was the first to call himself a Count of Fürstenberg. The castle was devastated in the Thirty Years' War, and it was never rebuilt.
