= Fürstenberg-Pürglitz =

Fürstenberg-Pürglitz was a noble family hailing from southwestern Baden-Württemberg, Germany, which was seated at Křivoklát Castle (German: Pürglitz) in Bohemia. Fürstenberg-Pürglitz emerged as a non-ruling branch of the princely House of Fürstenberg in 1762 following the death of Prince Joseph Wilhelm Ernst, and it inherited the principality after the princely line became extinct in 1804. Two years later in 1806, the principality was mediatised to Austria, Baden, Hohenzollern-Sigmaringen, and Württemberg.

== Princes of Fürstenberg-Pürglitz (1762–1806) ==
- Karl Borromäus Egon I, 1st Prince 1762-1787 (1729-1787), second son of Joseph Wilhelm Ernst, Prince of Furstenberg
  - Philip Maria Nerius, 2nd Prince 1787-1790 (1755-1790)
    - Karl Gabriel Maria, 3rd Prince 1790-1799 (1785-1799)
  - Prince Karl Joseph Aloys of Fürstenberg-Pürglitz (1760-1799)
    - Karl Egon II, 4th Prince 1799-1804 (1796-1854), then 5th Prince of Fürstenberg 1804-1806 after inheriting Fürstenberg-Fürstenberg

== Mediatized Princes of Fürstenberg (1806–present) ==
- Karl Egon II, 5th Prince 1806-1854 (1796-1854)
  - Karl Egon III, 6th Prince 1854-1892 (1820-1892)
    - Karl Egon IV, 7th Prince 1892-1896 (1852-1896)
  - Prince Maximilian Egon I of Furstenberg-Pürglitz (1822-1873)
    - Maximilian Egon II, 8th Prince 1896-1941 (1863-1941)
      - Karl Egon V, 9th Prince 1941-1973 (1891-1973), also Landgrave of Fürstenberg-Weitra
      - Prince Maximilian Egon of Fürstenberg (1896-1959)
        - Joachim Egon, 10th Prince 1973-2002 (1923-2002)
          - Heinrich, 11th Prince 2002–present (born 1950)
            - Christian, Hereditary Prince of Fürstenberg (born 1977)
            - Prince Antonius of Fürstenberg (born 1985)
          - Prince Karl Egon of Fürstenberg (born 1953)
          - Prince Johannes of Fürstenberg-Weitra (born 1958), adopted by Karl Egon V and inherited the Landgraviate of Fürstenberg-Weitra in 1973
            - Prince Vincenz of Fürstenberg-Weitra (born 1985)
            - Prince Ludwig of Fürstenberg-Weitra (born 1997)
            - Prince Johann Christian of Fürstenberg-Weitra (born 1999)
        - Prince Friedrich Maximilian of Fürstenberg (1926-1969)
          - Prince Maximilian of Fürstenberg (born 1962)
            - Prince Friedrich Götz of Fürstenberg (born 1995)
