= Ortenberg, Baden-Württemberg =

Ortenberg
- Municipality
- Coat of arms

- Location of Ortenberg within Ortenaukreis district
- Interactive map of Ortenberg
- Location within Germany Location within Baden-Württemberg
- Coordinates: 48°27′05″N 07°58′17″E
- Country: Germany
- State: Baden-Württemberg
- Admin. region: Freiburg
- District: Ortenaukreis

Government
  - Mayor (2016–24): Markus Vollmer

Area
  - Total: 5.66 km^{2} (2.19 sq mi)
- Elevation: 163 m (535 ft)

Population (2025-12-31)
  - Total: 3,569
  - Density: 631/km^{2} (1,630/sq mi)
- Time zone: UTC+01:00 (CET)
  - Summer (DST): UTC+02:00 (CEST)
- Postal codes: 77799
- Dialling codes: 0781
- Vehicle registration: OG, BH, KEL, LR, WOL
- Website: www.ortenberg.de

Ortenberg (German: [ˈɔʁtn̩bɛʁk]; Low Alemannic: Ordäberig) is a municipality in the district of Ortenaukreis, Baden-Württemberg.

== Geography ==
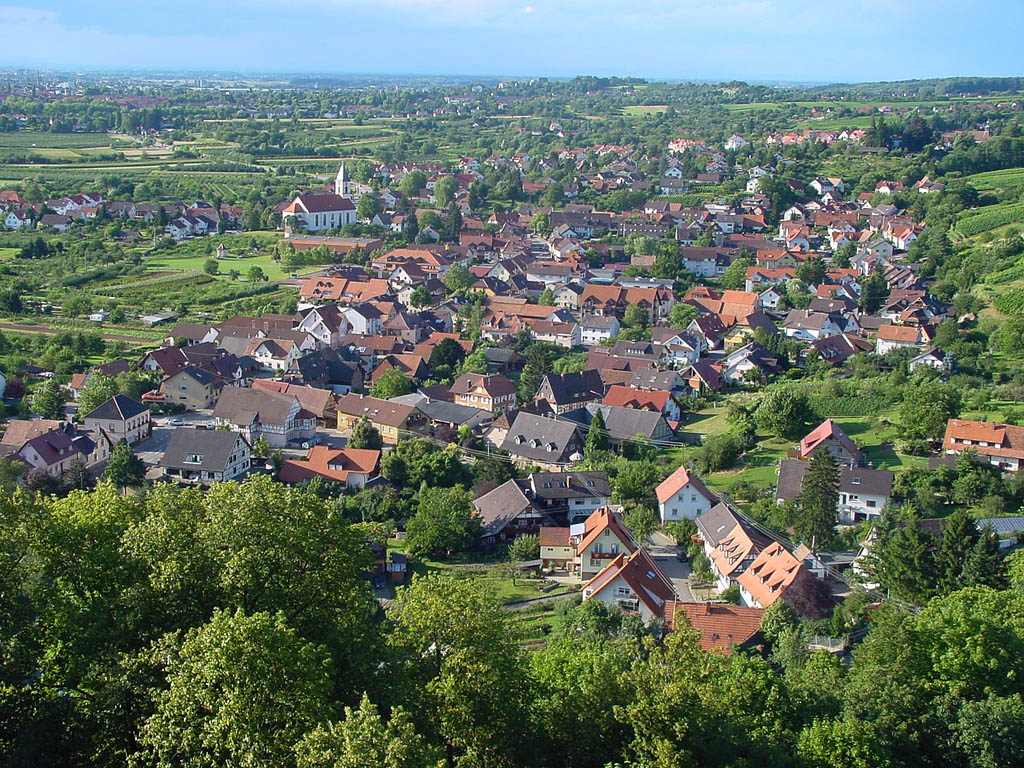
Ortenberg, photographed from the vineyards

Ortenberg is located in the foothills of the Black Forest, on the edge of the Kinzig valley and on the border of the Upper Rhine Plain. It is only a short distance, 5 kilometers, away from the town of Offenburg. The Badische Weinstraße (Baden wine route) runs through Ortenberg.

=== Neighboring Municipalities ===
The municipality of Ortenberg borders with the municipality of Offenburg's three sides. To the east, Ortenberg borders on Ohlsbach.

== History ==
First mentioned in a document in 1148, the town carried the name Dottenwiler/Tatenwilre at that time. It was not until the mid 14th century that the name of the castle, which had been referred to as castrum Ortinberg as early as 1233, was given to the town. The castle was destroyed in 1678. However, it was rebuilt by Leonhard von Berckholtz in the 19th century.

Between 1573 and 1630, a witch-hunt took place in Ortenberg and 19 women were executed for witchcraft.

For a long time, Ortenberg was part of the district of Offenburg. However, since 1973, the year when the district was split up, the town has belonged to the district of Ortenau.

== Government ==
=== Mayors ===
- 1969–2008: Hermann Litterst
- since 2008: Markus Vollmer
- since 2021: Elias Fischer

=== Sister Cities ===
Ortenberg has two sister cities:

- France Stotzheim, Elsass, France, since 1965
- Germany Ortenberg (Hessen), Hessen, Germany, since 1976

== Sights ==
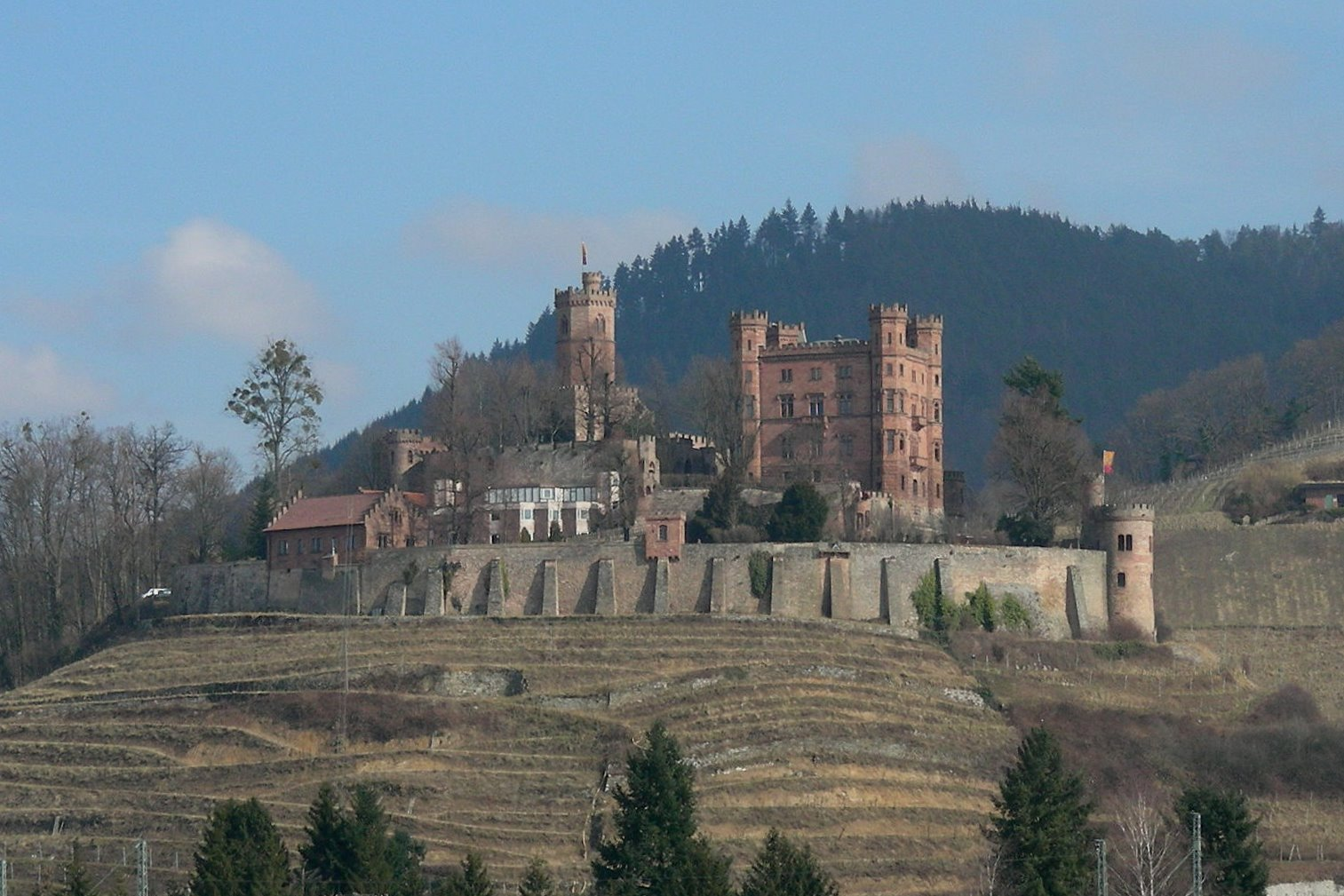
Ortenberg Castle

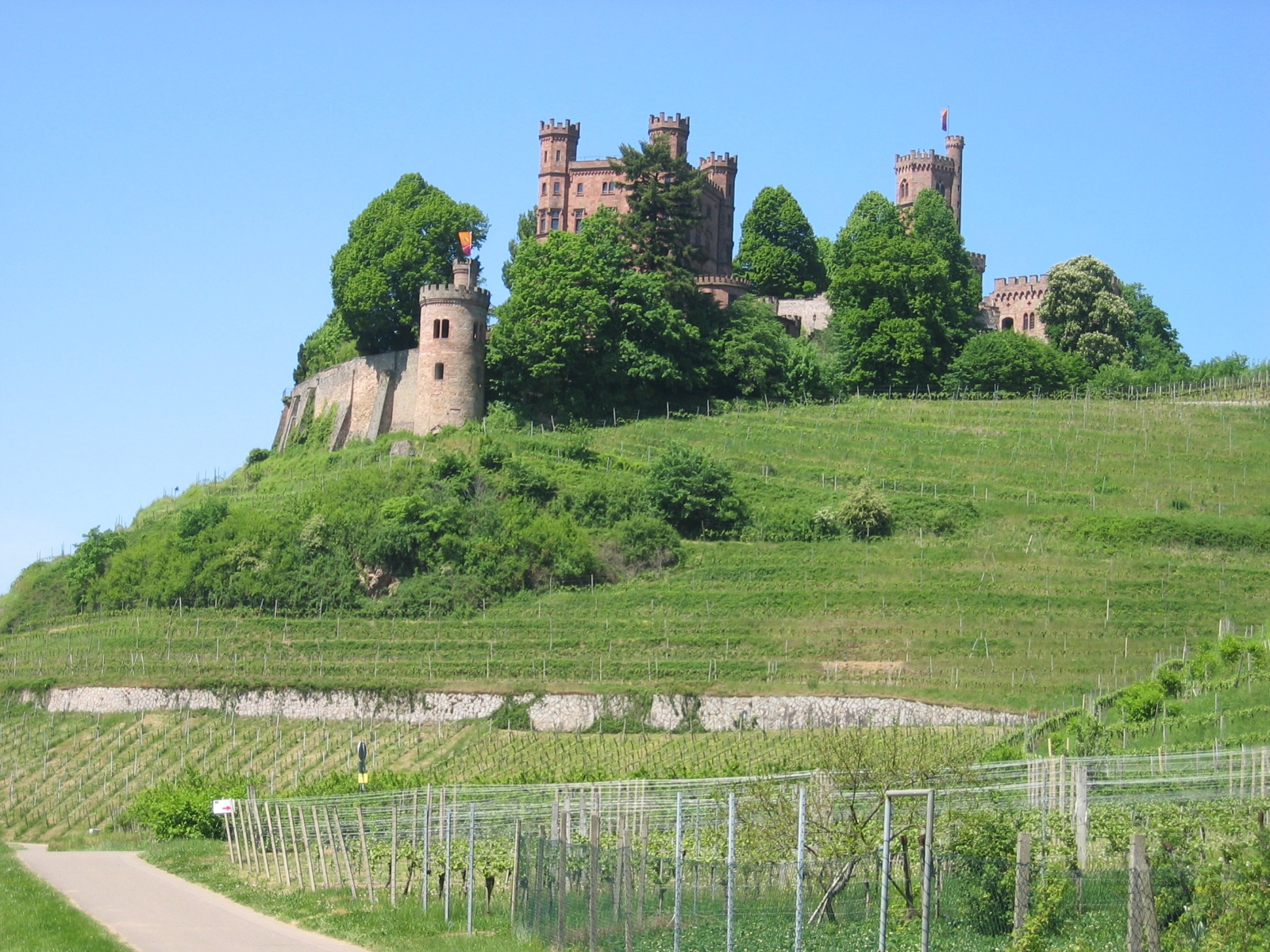
Ortenberg Castle in May, 2008

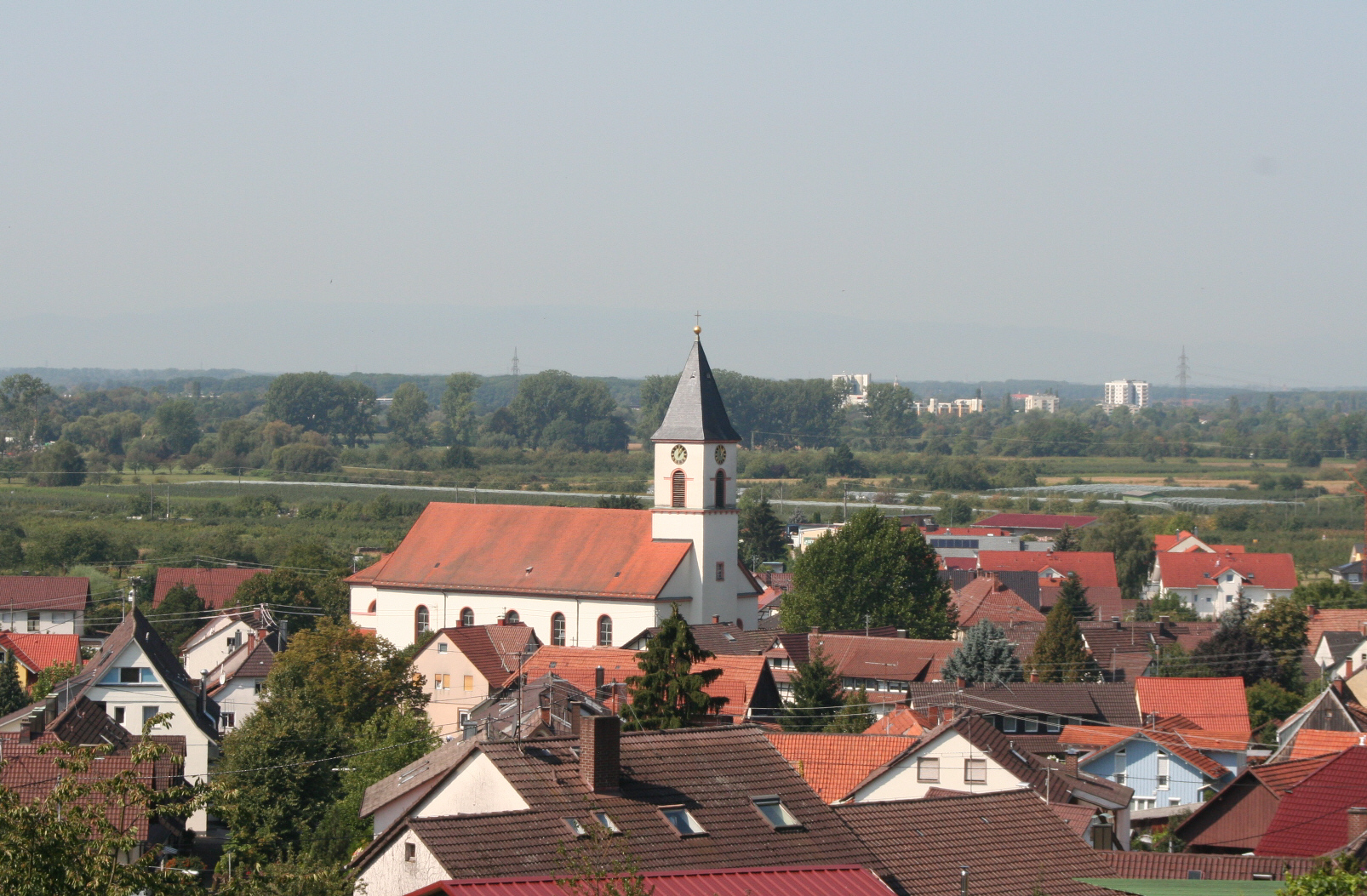
St. Bartholomew church, constructed by Hans Voß

Ortenberg Castle serves as a youth hostel. The towers, however, are open for visitors. The castle-like construction, as it stands today, was planned by the German architect Friedrich Eisenlohr and built between 1838 and 1843 by Gabriel Leonhard von Beckholtz, a Livonian merchant. The ruins of the former castle, which had been destroyed in 1678, provided the basis for re-construction. Contrary to popular opinion, only the municipality Ortenberg but not the district Ortenau was named after this castle. This term was derived from the former term Mortenau (Latin Moridunum = marshland). The initial consonant was lost in the 16th century due to colloquialism.

Bühlerweg chapel was constructed in 1497 and has been used ecumenically since 1972.

St. Bartholomew parish church was constructed by Hans Voß in a style similar to Weinbrenner's architecture. Marie Ellender created the paintings in Nazarene style that can be found by the altar.

== Economy and infrastructure ==
Ortenberg is a municipality in which wine is grown. It is part of the wine-growing region of Ortenau in the wine-growing area of Baden.

=== Transport ===
Even though Ortenberg is located on Black Forest Railway, which leads from Offenburg to Singen, the train station has been out of use since the 1980s. At the moment, Ortenau S-Bahn company is planning to re-open the stop.

=== Education ===
Von-Berckholtz-Schule is the only elementary school in Ortenberg. For the younger children, there is a kindergarten.

== Well-known People ==
=== Coming from Ortenberg ===
- Theodor von Brand: a German-American parasitologist
- Angelica Schwall-Düren (born in 1948), a German politician (member of the SPD), was brought up in Ortenberg.

=== Honorary citizens ===
- 1938: Gabriel Leonhard von Berckholtz
- 1987: Franz Vollmer, a German author and local historian
- 1998: René Weisgerber, former mayor of the Alsatian sister city of Stotzheim
- 2008: Herrmann Litterst, former mayor of Ortenberg (from 1969 to 2008)
- 2009: Richard Huber, former priest of Ortenberg (from 1991 to 2009)
