= Frederick Rudolf of Fürstenberg =

Frederick Rudolf
- Count of Fürstenberg-Stühlingen
- Predecessor: Christoph II of Fürstenberg
- Successor: Maximilian Franz of Fürstenberg
- Years active: 1615–1650
- Born: Frederick Rudolf; April 23, 1602; Blumberg
- Died: October 25, 1655 (aged 53); Datschitz
- Wars and battles: Thirty Years' War
- Parents: Christoph II of Fürstenberg and Dorothea of Sternberg

Frederick Rudolf of Fürstenberg was a Count of Fürstenberg. He fought in the Thirty Years' War. He died near Datschitz in the modern-day Czech Republic.

== Marriages and issue ==
Frederick Rudolf married firstly to Maria of Pappenheim († 1635), they had a son:

- Maximilian Franz (1634–1681)

Frederick Rudolf married secondly to Anna Magdalena of Hanau-Lichtenberg. They had five children:

- Francis (1636–1636)
- Ferdinand Anselm (1637–1637)
- Maria Franziska (1638–1680)
- Adam Leopold (1642–1643)
- Catherine Elizabeth (1643–1643)
