= Friedrich Eisenlohr =

German architect (1805–1855)

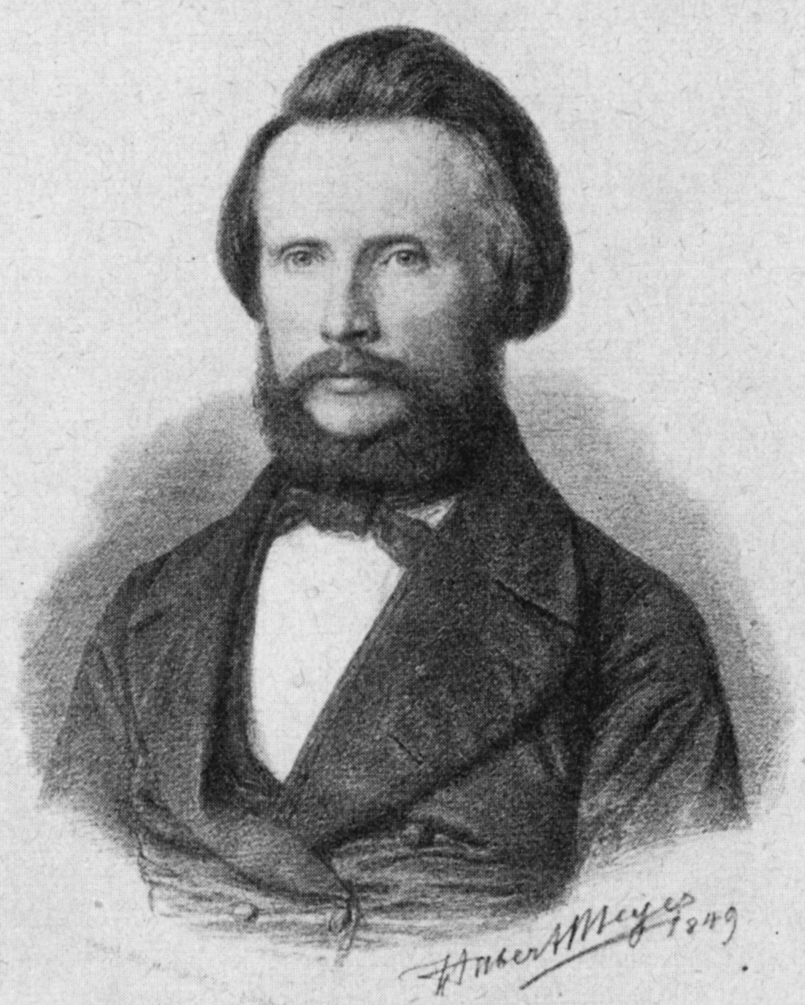
Friedrich Eisenlohr; portrait by Hubert Meyer (1849)

Jakob Friedrich Eisenlohr (23 November 1805, in Lörrach – 27 February 1854, in Karlsruhe) was a German architect and university professor. His design for a cuckoo clock, now known as the Bahnhäusle (train station) style, was the first to be mass-produced and helped make the clocks popular outside of Germany.

== Life and work ==
His father, Jakob Friedrich Eisenlohr (1777–1854), was an evangelical pastor. From 1821 to 1824, he studied in Freiburg im Breisgau with the architect, Christoph Arnold. After that, he moved to Karlsruhe, where he studied at the building school operated by Friedrich Weinbrenner. From 1826 to 1828, he continued his studies in Italy.

After serving an apprenticeship, he became a teacher at the Polytechnischen Oberschule in Karlsruhe where, in 1839, he became a building official, and was appointed a Professor of architecture and construction. One of his first assignments, as an assistant to Heinrich Hübsch, was managing the relocation of a church belonging to Tennenbach Abbey. He also dealt with tall structures belonging to the Baden Railway, as well as planning stations and designing over 300 station-keeper's houses.

In addition to his railway structures, he worked on the reconstruction of Ortenberg Castle, and designed several public buildings; such as the drinking hall in Badenweiler and the Freiburg festival hall. Together with the sculptor, August Kiss, he designed the Prussian monument at the old cemetery in Karlsruhe.

In 1853, he was named head of the building school at the Karlsruhe Institute of Technology. He was married to Wilhelmine von Biedenfeld (1801–1882), the daughter of General Ferdinand Friedrich von Biedenfeld.

== Selected works ==
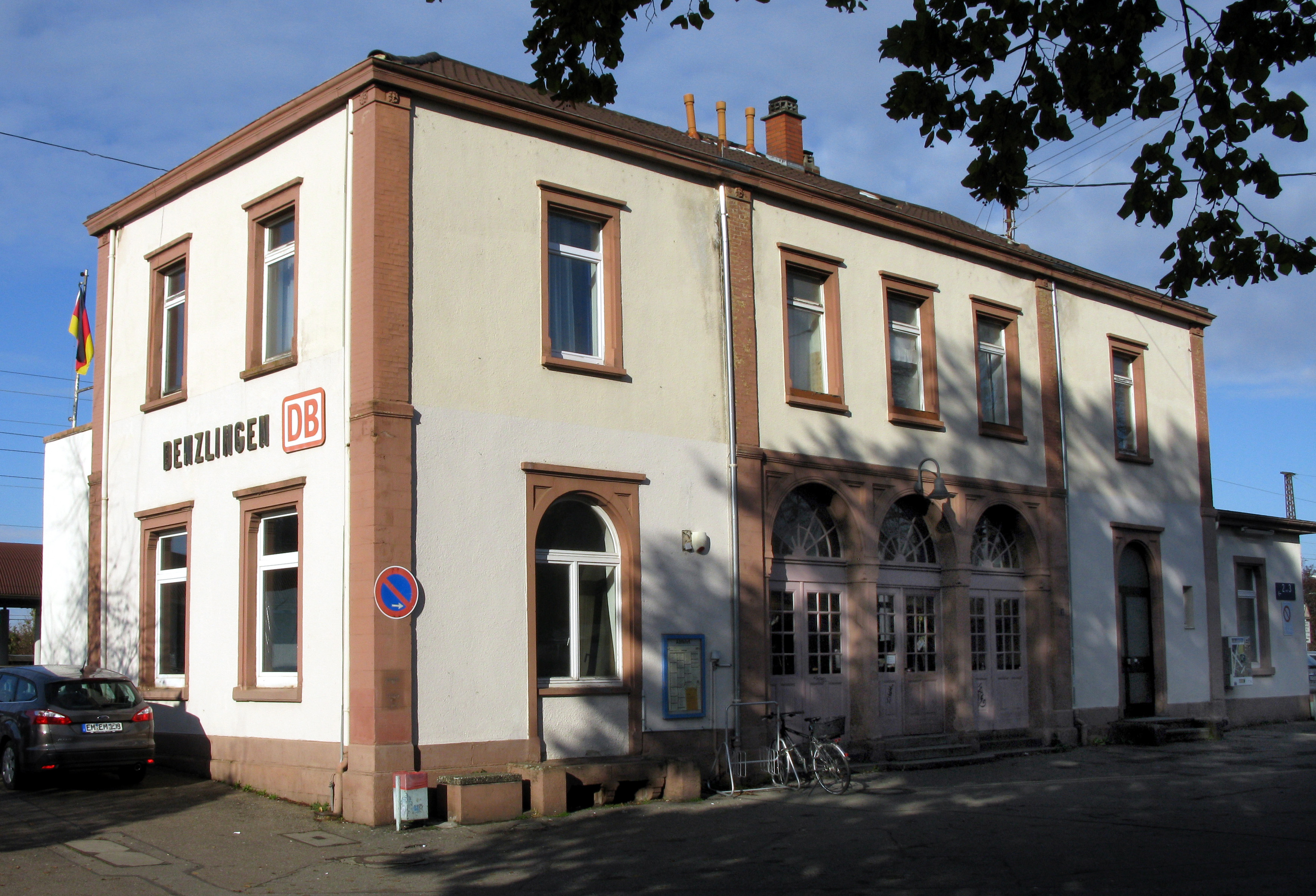
The railway station in Denzlingen

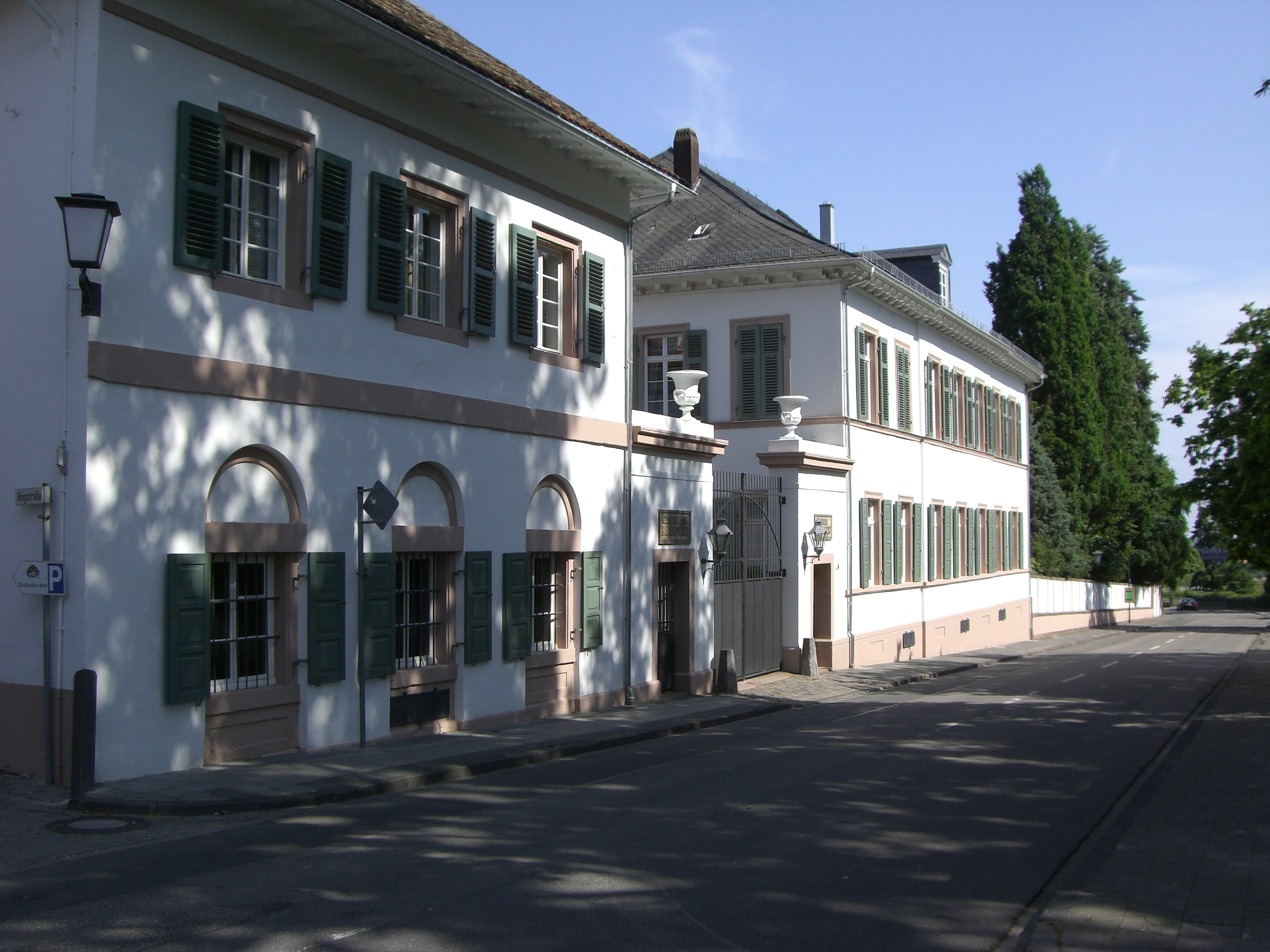
A winery in Wachenheim

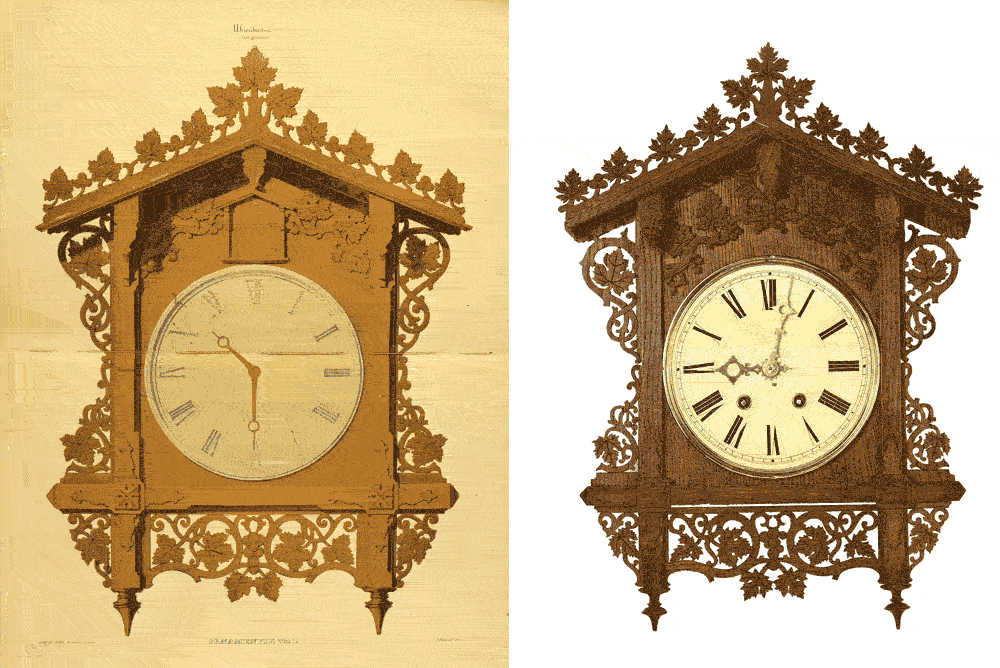
The original design and first model of the Bahnhäusle cuckoo clock

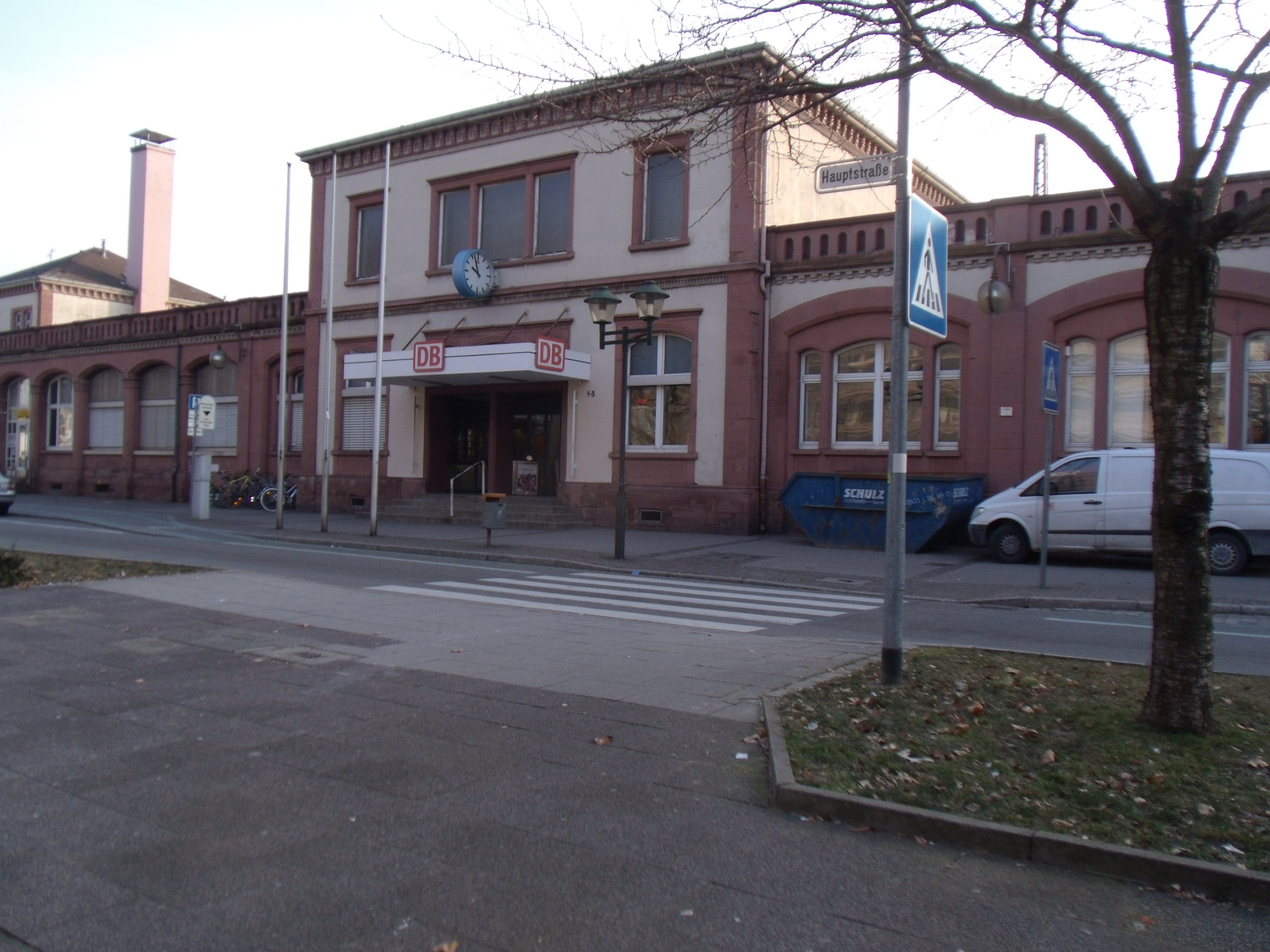
The railway station in Offenburg
