= Ortenberg Castle =

Coordinates: 48.4437°N 7.9732°E

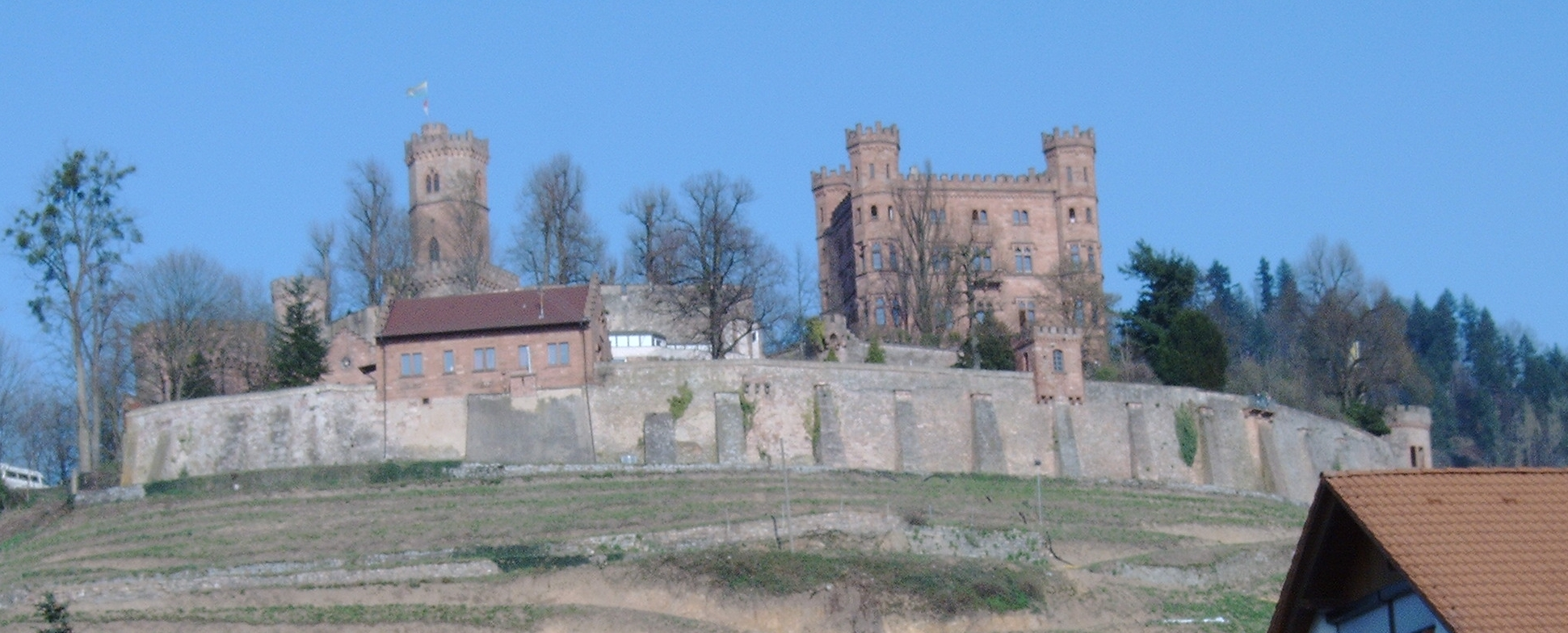
Ortenberg Castle

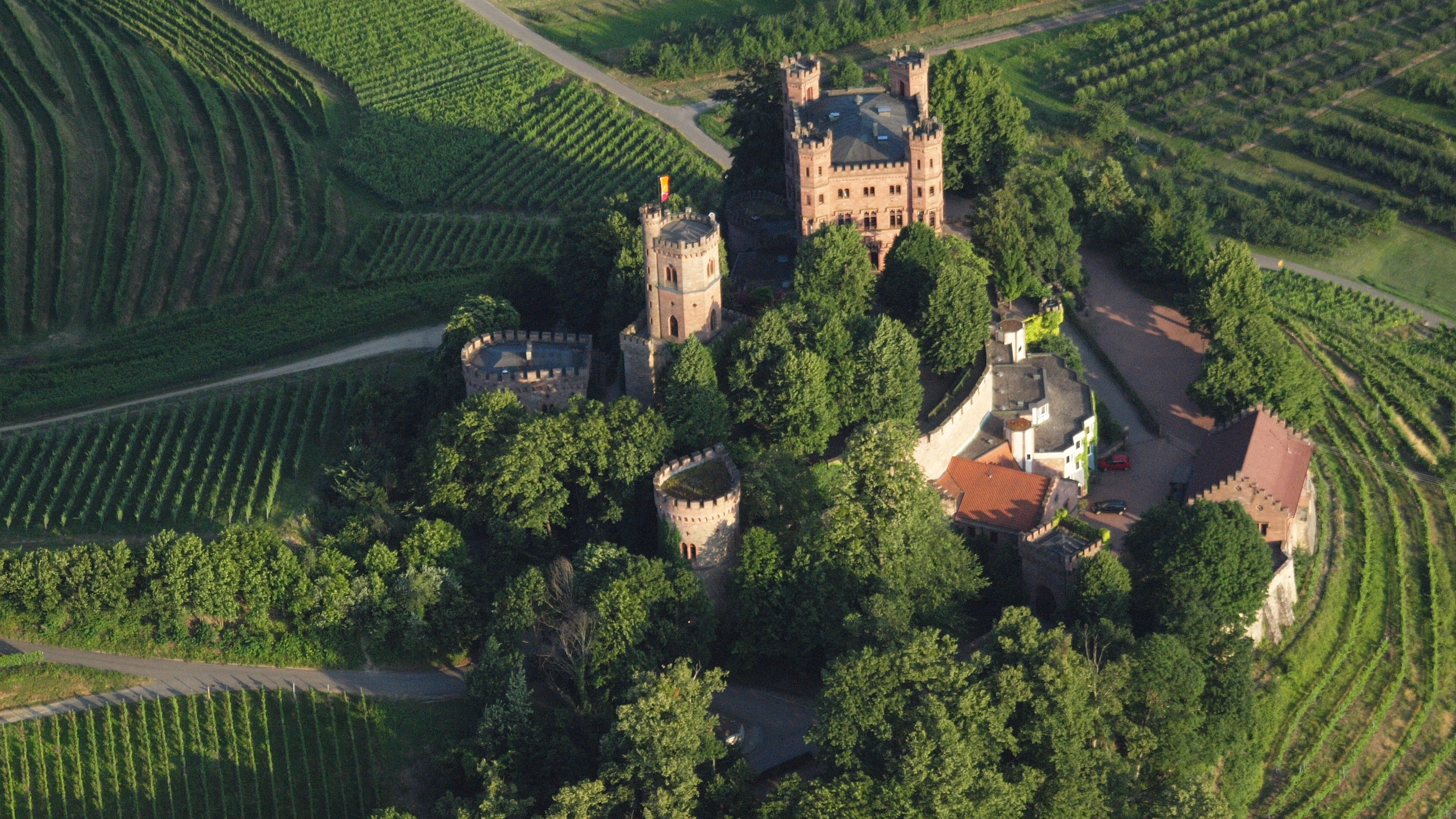
Ortenberg Castle, aerial photograph from 2013

Ortenberg Castle (German: Schloss Ortenberg, pronounced [ˈʃlɔs ˈʔɔʁtn̩bɛʁk]) is the main landmark of the Ortenau and is situated above the town of Ortenberg at the end of the Kinzig Valley between Offenburg and Gengenbach.

The origins of the Ortenau Castle can be traced back to the 11th/12th century. The castle was built by the House of Zähringen to protect the Kinzig Valley. Today, there is a youth hostel in the castle.

== History ==
Following the construction by the House of Zähringen in the 11th/12th century, the castle served as the administrative center for the Landvögte (bailiffs) of the district of Ortenau during the reign of the Hohenstaufen. The administrative seat for Landvogtei Ortenau (bailiwick of Ortenau) served as the center of imperial taxation, a court and customs authority. The castle was the birth place of Lady Gertrude Rickeldey of Ortenberg. The first extensions to the castle, fortified towers (roundels) that contained cannons, were built in the 15th century. The castle was destroyed in 1678 during the Franco-Dutch War by Francois de Crequy, marshal of France under the orders of Louis XIV of France. Following the re-construction, the castle was destroyed once more in 1697. The administrative center of the Landvögte was moved to Offenburg by Franz de Neveu due to this incident. The castle as it stands today, was constructed between 1838 and 1843. Baron Gabriel Leonhard von Berckholtz (1781–1863) from Livland had Friedrich Eisenlohr, a German architect, re-construct the castle in Gothic style. The medieval ruins provided the basis for construction. Georg Jakob Schneider, a student of Eisenlohr, was designated construction site manager. The castle has been used as a youth hostel since 1942. Further repairs in order to maintain the fabric of the building were made in 1974–1981. From 1984 to 1985 the Malerturm was restored, followed by the Schimmelturm and the Jakobsturm, which were restored from 1986 to 1988.

The castle was announced monument of the month in February 2010 by the Baden-Württemberg Foundation for Monument Protection.

== Architecture ==
=== The towers ===
==== Malerturm ====
The Malerturm once was the studio of the painter Alexandra von Berckholtz, the daughter of Gabriel L. Berckholtz, who built the castle. Originally, the tower was built as a powder tower (arsenal) in the 15th century. Today, it is used for wedding ceremonies.

==== Jakobsturm ====
During the re-construction of the castle from 1838 to 1843, another tower was added to the existing two stories of the zwinger construction. The tower was named after son of the builder of the castle and served to defend the castle against enemies that had forced their way into the neck ditch. The inside of Jakobsturm was renovated between 1986 and 1987.

==== Schimmelturm ====
The Schimmelturm is the highest tower of the castle. Between 1986 and 1988, the inside of the tower was renovated. Furthermore, a new staircase tower was built as the original one had been blown up in 1678. As early as around 1840, the height of the tower was increased with an extension in Gothic Style. Today, there is a staircase in the tower. The current doors don't originate from the time of construction of the castle, either. In the tower, there used to be a dungeon, where prisoners were let down by means of a winch. The walls had a thickness of 4 meters. The dungeon was used between 1679 and 1697, the years after the destruction of the castle, until the imperial bailiwick prison was built in 1770. The prison was in the old town hall of Hohberg-Diersburg.

Today, the tower serves as a lookout tower.

==== Kapellenturm ====
The Kapellenturm is a former battery tower that was constructed in the 15th century and was partially destroyed in 1678. Between 1838 and 1843, it was renovated and later served as the castle's chapel.

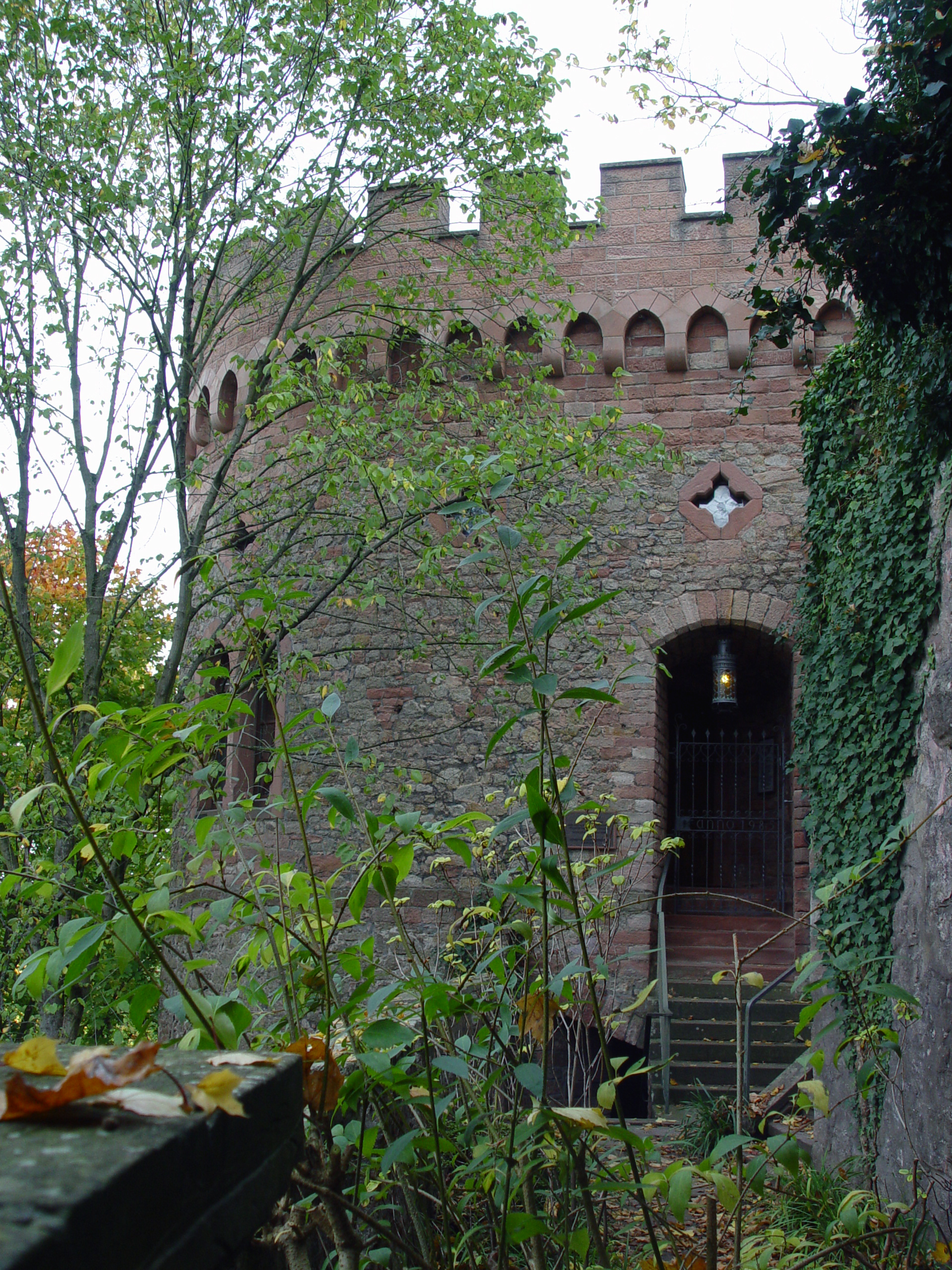
Malerturm

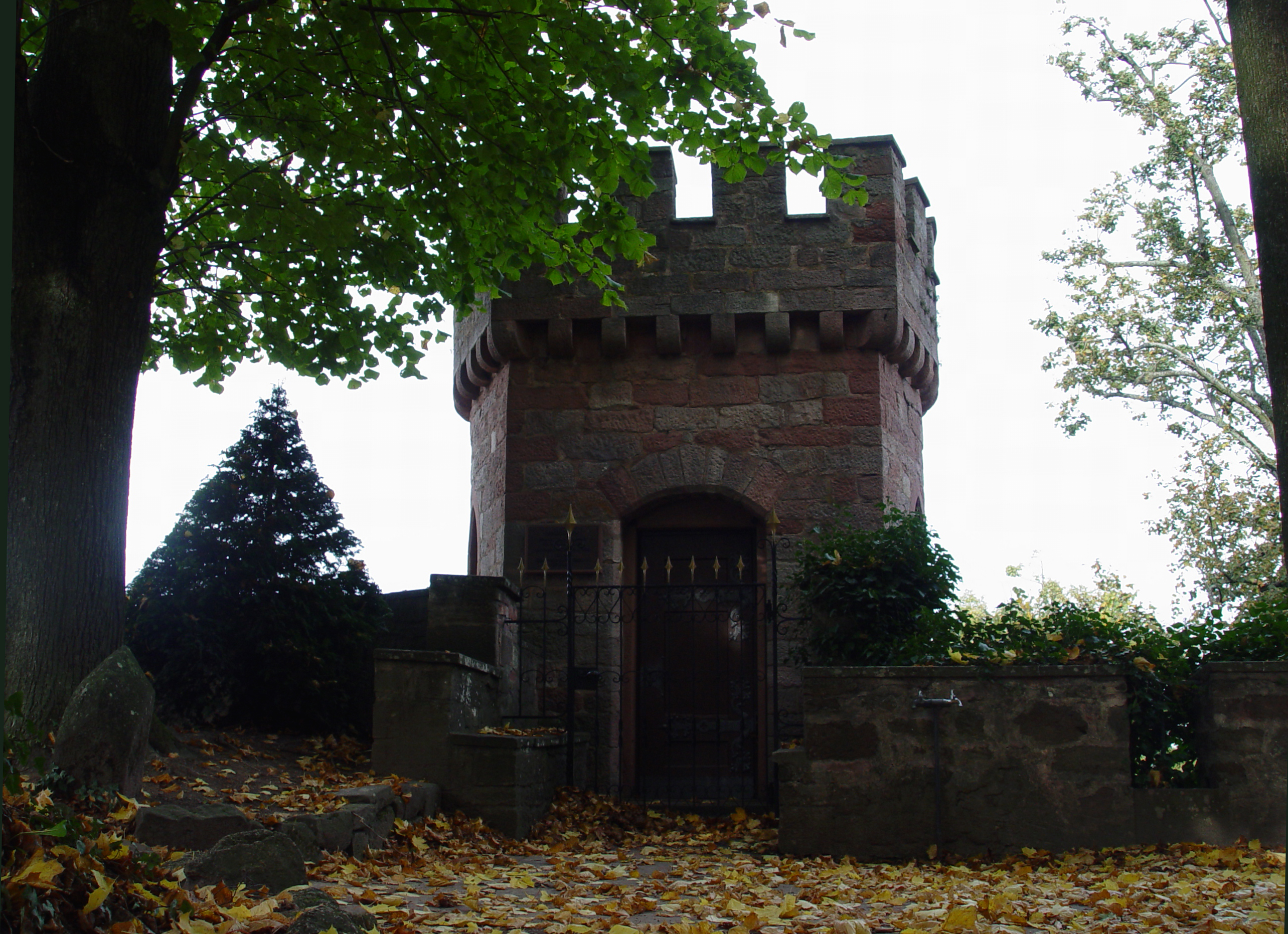
Jakobsturm

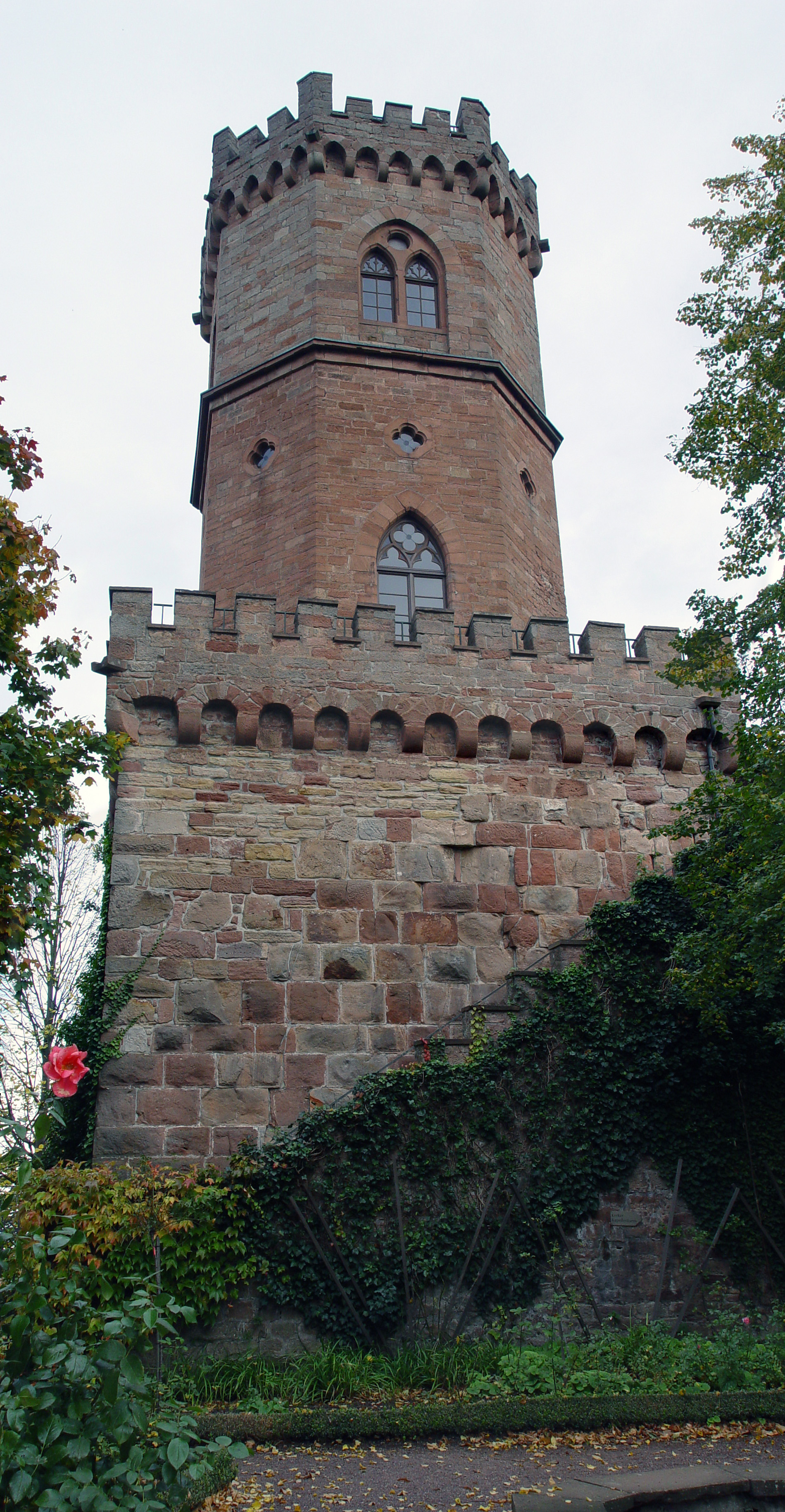
Schimmelturm

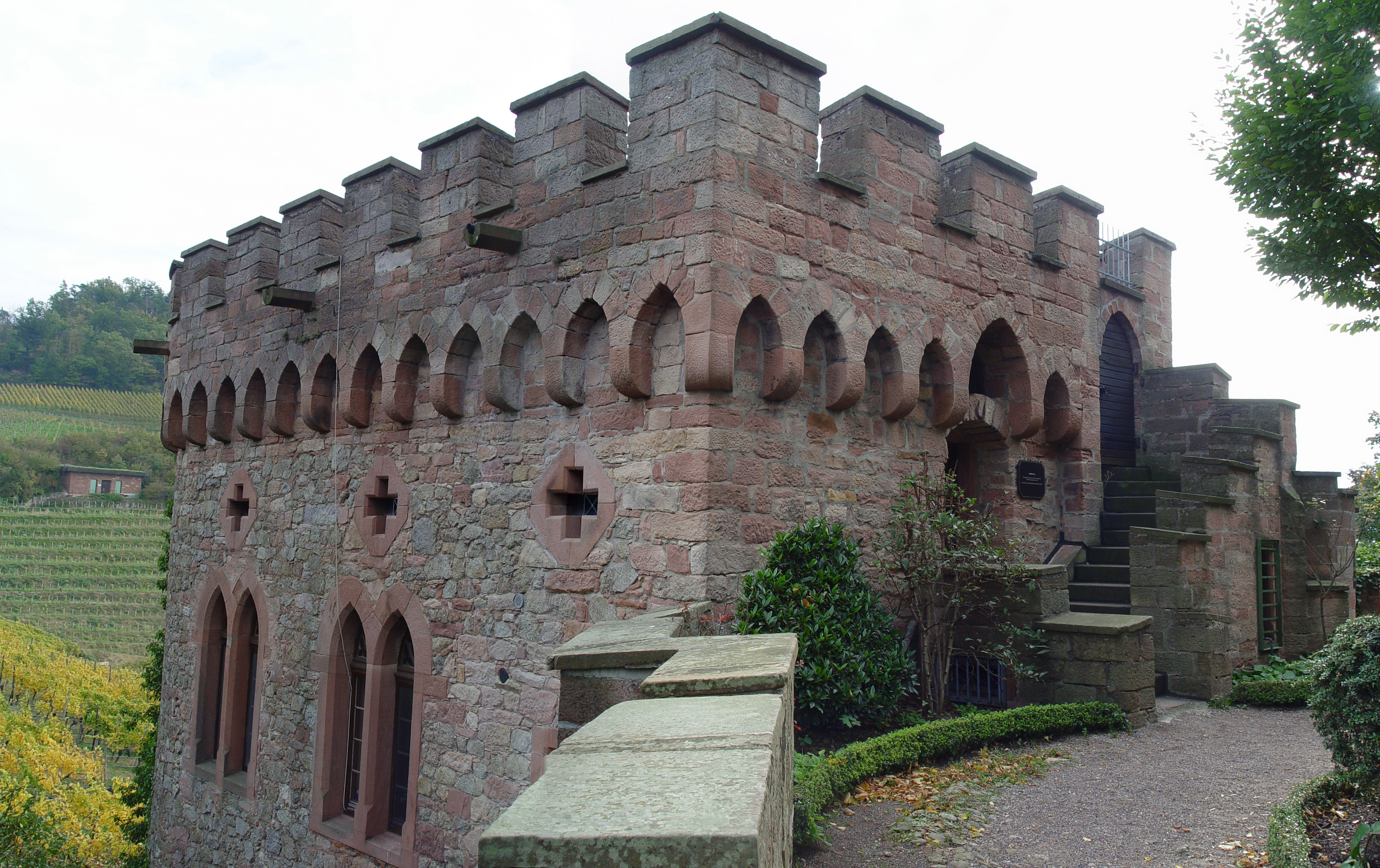
Kapellenturm

=== Felsenkeller ===
To this day, the Felsenkeller, which was pillaged in 1678, has not been excavated.
