= Johann, 6th Prince of Khevenhüller-Metsch =

Member of the Princely Khevenhuller family

Johann Karl von Khevenhüller-Metsch
- Prince of Khevenhüller-Metsch
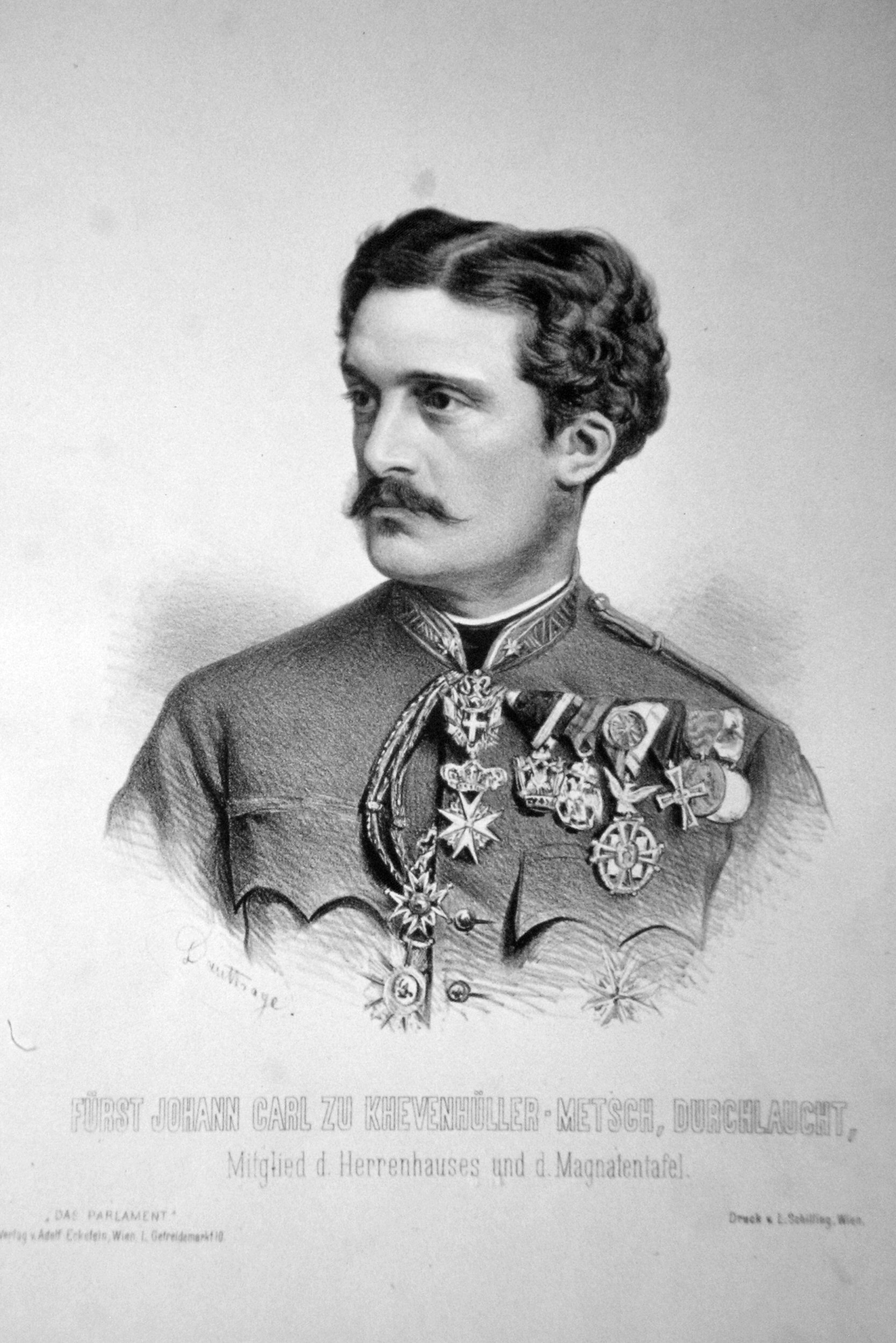
- Lithograph by Adolf Dauthage, c. 1880
- Full name: Johann Franz Karl Eduard Joseph Nemesius von Khevenhüller-Metsch
- Born: 19 December 1839; Ladendorf, Mistelbach District, Lower Austria
- Died: 11 September 1905 (aged 65); Riegersburg Castle, Riegersburg
- Noble family: Khevenhüller-Metsch
- Spouse: Countess Eduardine Clam-Gallas (m. 1871; died 1905)
- Father: Richard, 5th Prince of Khevenhüller-Metsch
- Mother: Countess Antonia Maria Lichnowsky

Johann Franz Karl Eduard Joseph Nemesius, 6th Prince of Khevenhüller-Metsch (19 December 1839 – 11 September 1905), was an Austrian prince.

== Early life ==
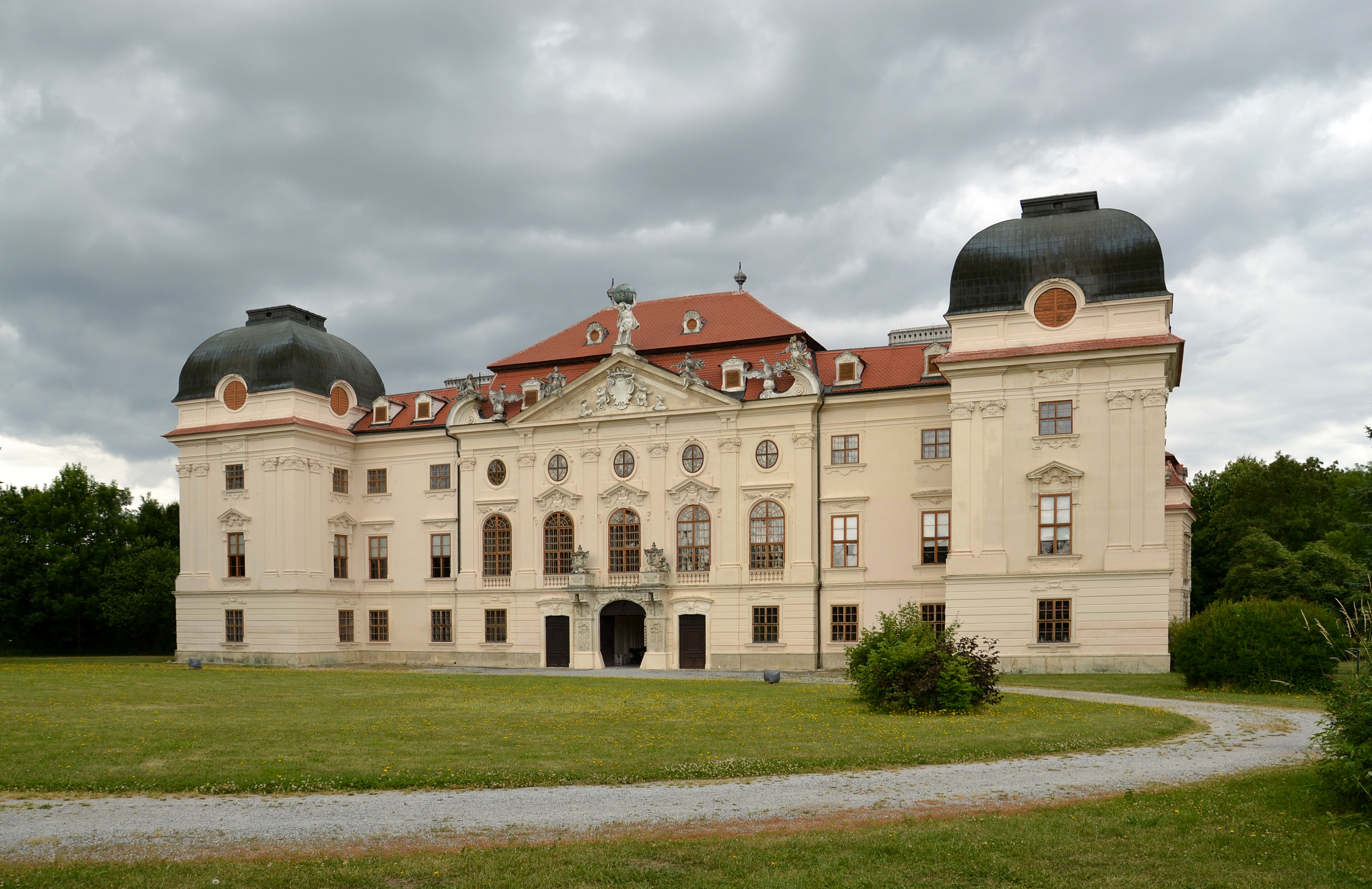
Riegersburg Castle

Johann Karl was born on 19 December 1839 at Ladendorf Castle, Mistelbach District, Lower Austria. He was the son of Richard, 5th Prince of Khevenhüller-Metsch and Countess Antonia Maria Lichnowsky. Among his siblings were Countess Maria von Khevenhüller-Metsch (wife of Count Rudolf Chotek von Chotkowa und Wognin), Count Sigmund Maria von Khevenhüller-Metsch (who married Countess Maria-Anna von Herberstein), Countess Leontine Antonie Marie von Khevenhüller-Metsch (wife of Maximilian Egon I, Prince of Fürstenberg and, after his death, Prince Emil Egon of Fürstenberg, both sons of Charles Egon II, Prince of Fürstenberg), and Count Rudolf Khevenhüller-Metsch (who married Princess Alexandrine Windisch-Graetz, a daughter of Hugo, 2nd Prince of Windisch-Graetz).

His paternal grandparents were Franz, 4th Prince of Khevenhüller-Metsch, and, his third wife (and niece), Countess Krisztina Zichy de Zich et Vásonkeő. His maternal grandparents were Prince Eduárd Lichnowsky (a son of Karl Alois, Prince Lichnowsky) and Countess Eleonora Zichy de Zich et Vásonkeö. His grandmothers, Countess Krisztina and Countess Eleanora, were sisters, both being daughters of Count Károly Zichy, the Lord Chief Justice of the Kingdom of Hungary.

== Career ==
From 1872 to 1877, he was a member of the Bohemian Diet and the House of Deputies in Austria, as a member of the Liberal "Constitutional Landowners" (Verfassungstreuer Großgrundbesitz) party. Upon the death of his father on 29 November 1877, he became the 6th Prince of Khevenhüller-Metsch and became a member of the Austrian House of Lords. He served as an Imperial and Royal Chamberlain, was a Knight of the Order of the Golden Fleece, member of the Imperial Council and member of the Magnates' Table.

He was a Cavalry Captain and companion of Emperor Maximilian I of Mexico (an Austrian Archduke, Maximilian was the younger brother of Emperor Franz Joseph I).

== Personal life ==
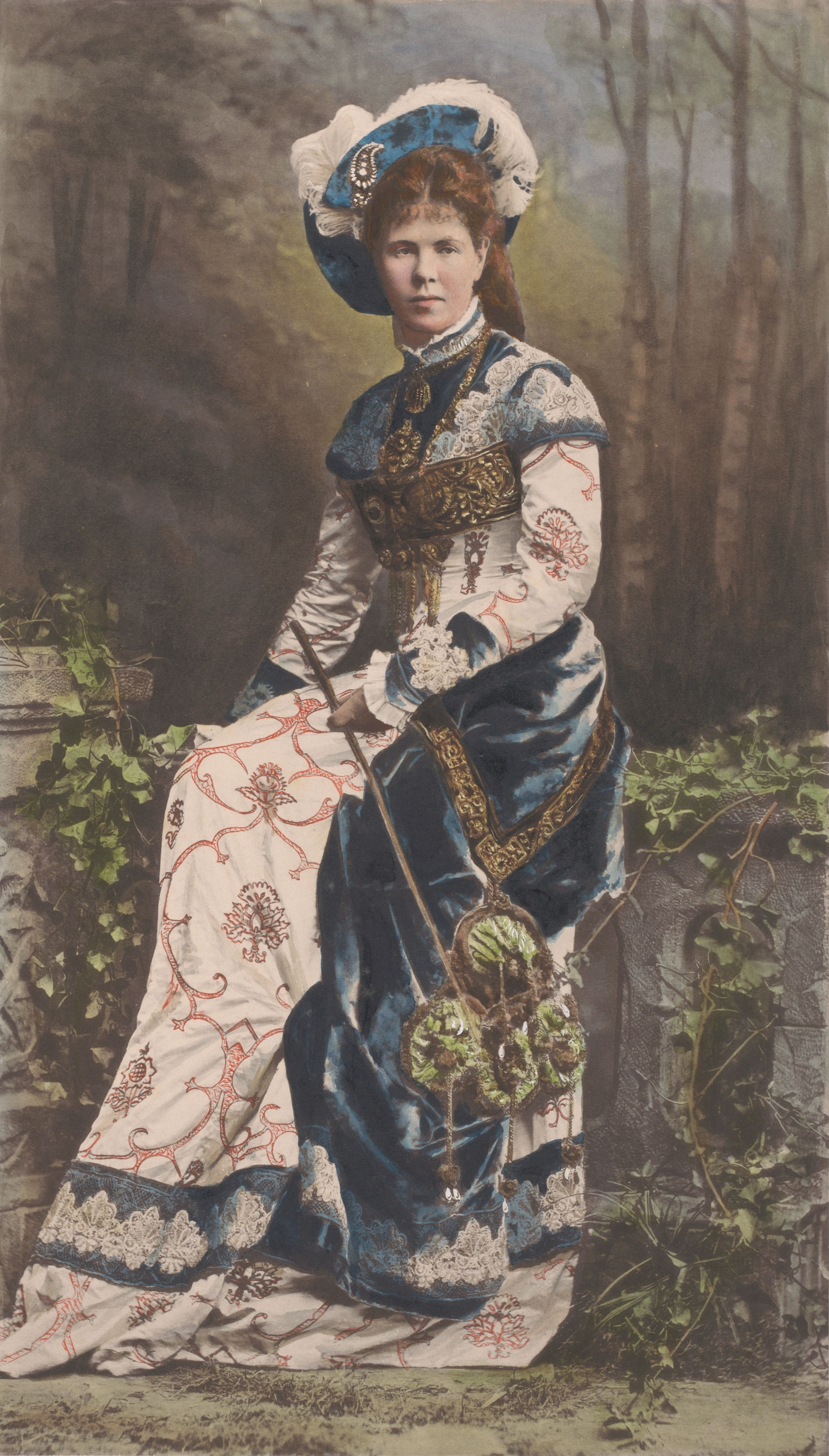
Portrait of his wife, Eduardine, c. 1880

On 17 June 1871 at Vienna, Khevenhüller-Metsch was married to Countess Eduardine "Edina" Clam-Gallas (1851–1925), a daughter of Count Eduard Clam-Gallas and Clotilde von Dietrichstein-Proskau (heiress of Prince Joseph-Franz von Dietrichstein and sister-in-law of Alexander von Mensdorff-Pouilly). Eduardine's siblings were Count Franz Clam-Gallas (who married Countess Maria von Hoyos-Sprinzenstein, a daughter of Count Ernst Karl von Hoyos-Sprinzenstein), and Countess Clotilde Clam-Gallas (wife of Count Koloman Festetics von Tolna).

The Prince died on 11 September 1905 at Riegersburg Castle in Riegersburg near Retz. As he died without issue, he was succeeded by his nephew, Sigismund von Khevenhüller-Metsch. His widow, Eduardine, died on 2 August 1925 at Opatija, a town in Primorje-Gorski Kotar County, Croatia.
