= Richard, 5th Prince of Khevenhüller-Metsch =

Member of the Princely Khevenhuller family

Richard von Khevenhüller-Metsch
- Prince of Khevenhüller-Metsch
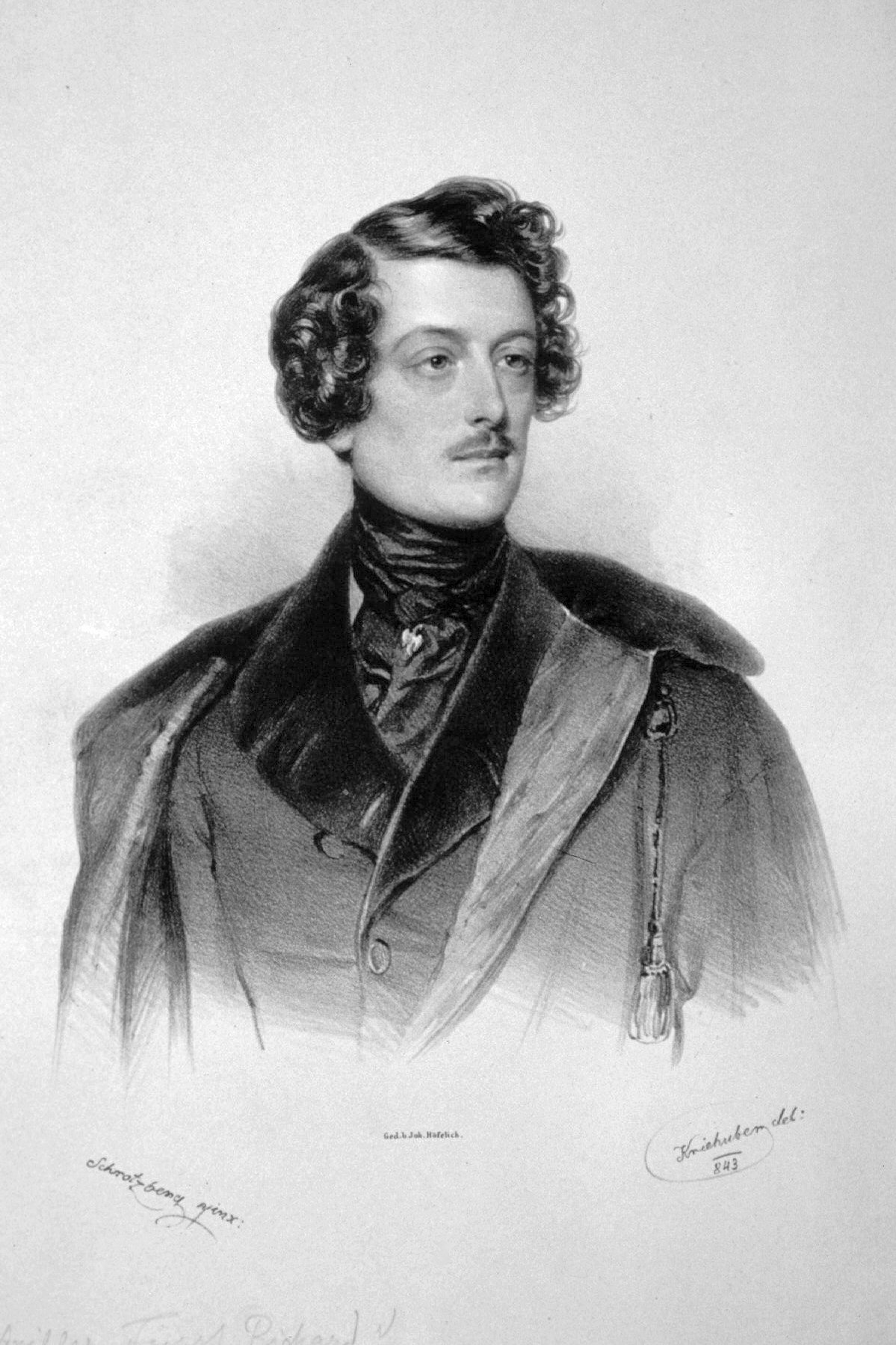
- Lithograph by Josef Kriehuber, 1843
- Full name: Richard Emanuel Desiderius Johann von Khevenhüller-Metsch
- Born: 23 May 1813; Thalheim bei Wels, Wels-Land District, Upper Austria
- Died: 29 November 1877 (aged 64); Ladendorf, Mistelbach District, Lower Austria
- Noble family: Khevenhüller-Metsch
- Spouse: Countess Antonia Maria Lichnowsky (m. 1836; died 1870)
- Issue: Count Ludwig Emmanuel; Countess Maria; Johann, 6th Prince of Khevenhüller-Metsch; Count Sigmund Maria; Countess Leontine Antonie; Count Rudolph Ladislaus
- Father: Franz, 4th Prince of Khevenhüller-Metsch
- Mother: Countess Krisztina Zichy de Zich et Vásonkeő

Richard Emanuel Desiderius Johann, 5th Prince of Khevenhüller-Metsch (23 May 1813 – 29 November 1877), was an Austrian prince.

== Early life ==
Richard was born on 23 May 1813 at Thalheim bei Wels, in the Wels-Land District of Upper Austria. He was the son of Franz, 4th Prince of Khevenhüller-Metsch, and, his third wife (and niece), Countess Krisztina "Christina" Zichy de Zich et Vásonkeő. His father had previously been married to, and widowed from, Countess Maria Elisabeth von Kuefstein (a daughter of Count Johann Adam von Kuefstein) and Countess Maria Josepha von Abensberg and Traun (a daughter of Johann Otto, 8th Count of Abensberg and Traun). Among his siblings were Count Othmar von Khevenhüller-Metsch (who married Baroness Leontine Kress von Kressenstein) and Countess Hedwig Maria von Khevenhüller-Metsch (who married Count Hermann Locatelli).

His paternal grandparents were Johann, 2nd Prince of Khevenhüller-Metsch and Princess Maria Amalia Susanna of Liechtenstein (a daughter of Prince Emanuel of Liechtenstein). His maternal grandparents were Count Károly Zichy, the Lord Chief Justice of the Kingdom of Hungary, and Countess Anna Maria Khevenhüller-Metsch (eldest daughter of Johann, 2nd Prince of Khevenhüller-Metsch).

== Career ==
From 1868 to 1869 and, again, from 1872 to 1877 he was a member of the Bohemian Diet. Upon the death of his father on 2 July 1837, he became the 5th Prince of Khevenhüller-Metsch and, from 1861, a member of the Austrian House of Lords.

== Personal life ==
On 15 June 1836, he married his first cousin, Countess Antonia Maria Lichnowsky (1818–1870), a daughter of Prince Eduárd Lichnowsky (a son of Karl Alois, Prince Lichnowsky) and Countess Eleonora Zichy de Zich et Vásonkeö. Together, they were the parents of:

- Count Ludwig Emmanuel von Khevenhüller-Metsch (1837–1838), who died young.
- Countess Maria von Khevenhüller-Metsch (1838–1892), who married Count Rudolf Chotek von Chotkowa und Wognin, a son of Heřman Chotek de Chotkov et Vojnin and Marie Henrietta Brunsvick de Korompa.
- Johann Karl von Khevenhüller-Metsch (1839–1905), who married Countess Eduardine "Edina" Clam-Gallas, a daughter of Count Eduard Clam-Gallas and Clotilde von Dietrichstein-Proskau (heiress of Prince Joseph-Franz von Dietrichstein) in 1871.
- Count Sigmund Maria von Khevenhüller-Metsch (1841–1879), who married Countess Maria-Anna von Herberstein, a daughter of Count Friedrich zu Herberstein and Countess Thérèse von Dietrichstein-Proskau und Leslie.
- Countess Leontine Antonie Marie von Khevenhüller-Metsch (1843–1914), who married Prince Maximilian Egon I of Fürstenberg, a son of Charles Egon II, Prince of Fürstenberg and Amalie of Baden (a daughter of Charles Frederick, Grand Duke of Baden), in 1860. After his death in 1873, she married his younger brother, Prince Emil Egon of Fürstenberg, in 1875.
- Count Rudolph Ladislaus Johann Joseph Maria von Khevenhüller-Metsch (1844–1910), who married Princess Alexandrine Windisch-Graetz, a daughter of Hugo, 2nd Prince of Windisch-Graetz.

The Prince died on 29 November 1877 at Ladendorf Castle, Mistelbach District, Lower Austria. He was succeeded by his eldest surviving son, Johann Karl.

=== Descendants ===
Through his second surviving son, Count Sigmund, he was a grandfather of Sigismund von Khevenhüller-Metsch, who became the 7th Prince of Khevenhüller-Metsch in 1905 when his uncle, Johann Karl, died without male issue. When the 7th Prince died without surviving male issue in 1945, the title passed to Franz von Khevenhüller-Metsch, a grandson of the 5th Prince's younger brother, Count Othmar.
