= Franz, 4th Prince of Khevenhüller-Metsch =

Member of the Princely Khevenhuller family

Franz von Khevenhüller-Metsch
- Prince of Khevenhüller-Metsch
- Full name: Franz Maria Johann Joseph Hermann von Khevenhüller-Metsch
- Born: 7 April 1762; Vienna
- Died: 3 July 1837 (aged 75); Frohnsburg, Lower Austria
- Noble family: Khevenhüller-Metsch
- Spouses: Countess Maria Elisabeth von Kuefstein (m. 1791; died 1796) Countess Maria Josepha von Abensberg and Traun (m. 1798; died 1799) Countess Christina Zichy de Zich et Vásonkeő (m. 1812; died 1830)
- Issue: Count Johann Siegmund Friedrich; Count Johann Friedrich Richard; Countess Maria Anna Kunigunde; Richard, 5th Prince of Khevenhüller-Metsch; Count Othmar; Countess Hedwig Maria
- Father: Johann, 2nd Prince of Khevenhüller-Metsch
- Mother: Princess Amalia of Liechtenstein

Franz Maria Johann Joseph Hermann, 4th Prince of Khevenhüller-Metsch (7 April 1762 – 3 July 1837), was an Austrian aristocrat who was a member of the Austrian House of Lords.

== Early life ==
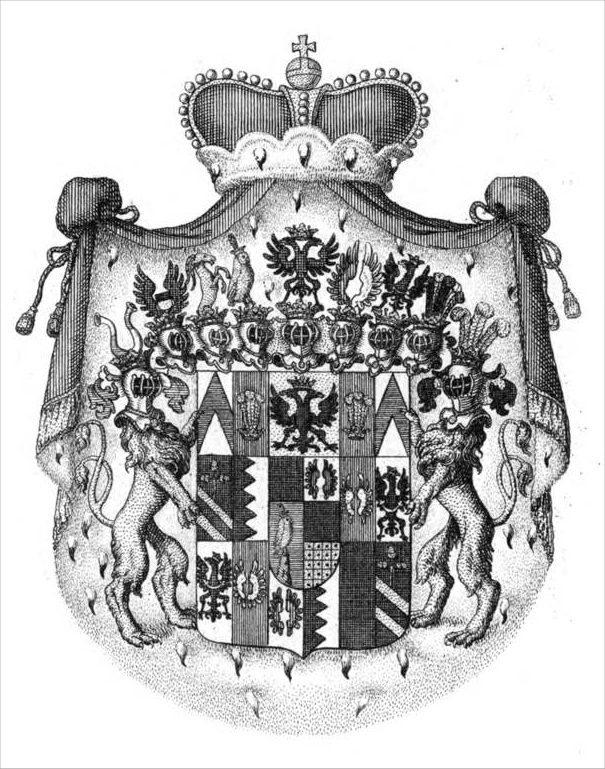
Coat of arms of the Princes of Khevenhüller-Metsch

Franz was born on 7 April 1762 at Vienna. He was a younger son of Johann, 2nd Prince of Khevenhüller-Metsch (1732–1801) and Princess Maria Amalia Susanna of Liechtenstein (1737–1787). Among his siblings were elder brother, Karl, 3rd Prince of Khevenhüller-Metsch, (Note: Karl, 3rd Prince of Khevenhüller-Metsch (1756–1823) married Countess Therese von Morzin, a daughter of Count Karl Joseph von Morzin and Maria Wilhelmine Reisky von Dubnitz.) Countess Anna Antonia Maria von Khevenhüller-Metsch, (Note: Countess Anna Antonia Maria von Khevenhüller-Metsch (1759–1809) married Count Károly Zichy de Zich et Vásonkeö, the Lord Chief Justice of the Kingdom of Hungary and son of Count István Zichy.) Countess Maria Christina Viktoria Vittoria von Khevenhüller-Metsch, (Note: Countess Maria Christina Viktoria Vittoria von Khevenhüller-Metsch (1760–1811) married Antonio Maria Erba-Odescalchi, 2nd Prince of Monteleone (a nephew of Cardinal Benedetto Erba Odescalchi and great-grandnephew of Pope Innocent XI).) Countess Maria Karolina Ferdinanda von Khevenhüller-Metsch, (Note: Countess Maria Karolina Ferdinanda von Khevenhüller-Metsch (1763–1858) married Giuseppe Antonio Maria Soresina Vidoni, Marchese di San Giovanni in Croce (he became later a Prince), a son of Cesare Francesco Soresina Vidoni, Marchese di San Giovanni in Croce, and Dorotea Soresina Pallavicini.) and Countess Marie Leopoldina von Khevenhüller-Metsch. (Note: Countess Marie Leopoldina von Khevenhüller-Metsch (1764–1845) married, as his second wife, Francesco Ruspoli, 3rd Prince of Cerveteri, son of Alessandro Ruspoli, 2nd Prince of Cerveteri.)

His paternal grandparents were Johann, 1st Prince of Khevenhüller-Metsch, and Countess Karolina Maria Augustina von Metsch. His father was a diplomat during the early reign of Empress Maria Theresa, serving as the Habsburg Ambassador to Denmark, Saxony, and as the Bohemian Ambassador to the Perpetual Diet of Regensburg. His maternal grandparents were Prince Emanuel of Liechtenstein and Countess Maria Anna Antonia von Dietrichstein-Weichselstädt.

== Career ==
Upon the death of his brother in 1823, he became the 4th Prince of Khevenhüller-Metsch and was a member of the Austrian House of Lords.

== Personal life ==
Franz was married, and widowed, three times. On 6 July 1791 in Vienna, he married Countess Maria Elisabeth von Kuefstein (1771–1796), a daughter of Count Johann Adam von Kuefstein. Before her death at Sankt Pölten on 8 April 1796, they were the parents of:

- Count Johann Siegmund Friedrich von Khevenhüller-Metsch (1793–1794), who died in infancy.
- Count Johann Friedrich Maria Richard von Khevenhüller-Metsch (1794–1795), who died in infancy.

He remarried at Sankt Pölten on 16 April 1798 to Countess Maria Josepha von Abensberg and Traun (1782–1799), a daughter of Johann Otto, 8th Count of Abensberg and Traun. She died on 6 March 1799, the day after she gave birth to their only child:

- Countess Maria Anna Kunigunde von Khevenhüller-Metsch (1799–1801), who died in infancy.

On 15 June 1812, he married, thirdly, to his niece, Countess Krisztina "Christina" Zichy de Zich et Vásonkeő (1792–1830), a daughter of Count Károly Zichy, the Lord Chief Justice of the Kingdom of Hungary, and, his elder sister, Countess Anna Maria Khevenhüller-Metsch. Before her death on 20 July 1830 at Penzing, they were the parents of:

- Richard Maria Johannes Basilius, 5th Prince of Khevenhüller-Metsch (1813–1877), who married his first cousin, Countess Antonia Maria Lichnowsky, a daughter of Prince Eduárd Lichnowsky (a son of Karl Alois, Prince Lichnowsky) and Countess Eleonora Zichy de Zich et Vásonkeö, in 1836.
- Count Othmar von Khevenhüller-Metsch (1819–1890), who married Baroness Leontine Kress von Kressenstein, a daughter of Baron Karl Kress von Kressenstein and Countess Leopoldine Zichy de Zich et Vásonkeö, at Vienna in 1850.
- Countess Hedwig Maria von Khevenhüller-Metsch (1823–1876), who married Count Hermann Locatelli in 1856.

The Prince died at Frohnsburg, Lower Austria, on 3 July 1837. He was succeeded by his eldest surviving son, Richard.
