= Johann, 2nd Prince of Khevenhüller-Metsch =

Austrian diplomat

Johann Sigismund Friedrich, 2nd Prince of Khevenhüller-Metsch (22 February 1732 – 15 June 1801) was an Austrian prince and diplomat.

== Early life ==
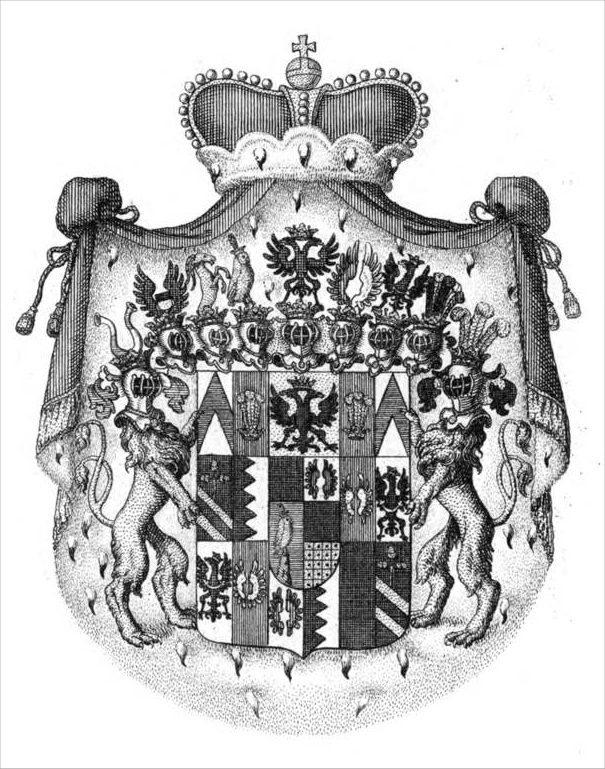
Coat of arms of the Princes of Khevenhüller-Metsch

Born Johann Sigismund Friedrich von Khevenhüller on 22 February 1732 in Vienna, he was the second born, but eldest surviving, son of Johann, 1st Prince of Khevenhüller-Metsch (1706–1776) and Countess Karolina Maria Augustina von Metsch (1706–1784). His father was a diplomat during the early reign of Empress Maria Theresa, serving as the Habsburg Ambassador to Denmark, Saxony, and as the Bohemian Ambassador to the Perpetual Diet of Regensburg.

His paternal grandparents were Count Sigmund Friedrich von Khevenhüller and, his second wife, Ernestine Leopoldine von Orsini-Rosenberg. His maternal grandfather was Imperial Vice-Chancellor (German: Reichsvizekanzler) Count Johann Adolf von Metsch. As his maternal grandfather had no male issue, he adopted his father, who took Metsch as an additional surname in 1751.

== Career ==
His father was created 1st Prince of Khevenhüller-Metsch in 1763. The family owned Riegersburg Castle in Hardegg and Ladendorf Castle in Lower Austria. Following his death on 18 April 1776, he succeeded as the 2nd Prince of Khevenhüller-Metsch and as Hofmeister from Lower Austria. He was also Prince of Aichelberg, Count of Hohen-Osterwitz and Annabüchl, Baron of Landskron and Wernberg, and Hereditary Lord of Carlsberg.

A diplomat like his father, he served as the Habsburg Ambassador to Portugal from 1756 to 1760, the Kingdom of Sardinia-Piedmont in Turin from 1763 to 1770, and Plenipotentiary Commissioner-General to the Duchy of Milan from 1775 to 1782, the Emperor Joseph II's highest representative in Imperial Italy. After his service in Milan, he retired from diplomatic service, and lived mainly in his Palace in Milan (designed by Italian architect Giuseppe Piermarini on Via Monte di Pietà, no. 1A) and other Italian cities before returning to Austria in 1801 shortly before his death.

He was made a Knight of the Order of the Golden Fleece.

== Personal life ==
On 25 February 1754 in Vienna, Khevenhüller-Metsch married Princess Maria Amalia Susanna of Liechtenstein (1737–1787), one of twelve children of Prince Emanuel of Liechtenstein and Countess Maria Anna Antonia von Dietrichstein-Weichselstädt. Among her siblings were Franz Joseph I, Prince of Liechtenstein (who married Countess Leopoldine von Sternberg) and Prince Karl Borromäus of Liechtenstein (who married Princess Eleonore von Oettingen-Spielberg). Together, they were the parents of nine children, at least six of whom lived to adulthood, including:

- Karl Maria Joseph Johann Baptist Clemens von Khevenhüller-Metsch (1756–1823), who married Countess Therese von Morzin, a daughter of Count Karl Joseph von Morzin and Maria Wilhelmine Reisky von Dubnitz, in 1805.
- Countess Anna Antonia Maria von Khevenhüller-Metsch (1759–1809), who married Count Károly Zichy de Zich et Vásonkeö, the Lord Chief Justice of the Kingdom of Hungary and son of Count István Zichy, in 1776.
- Countess Maria Christina Viktoria Vittoria von Khevenhüller-Metsch (1760–1811), who married Antonio Maria Erba-Odescalchi, 2nd Prince of Monteleone (in Calabria), a nephew of Cardinal Benedetto Erba Odescalchi and great-grandnephew of Pope Innocent XI.
- Franz Maria Johann Joseph Hermann von Khevenhüller-Metsch (1762–1837), who married Countess Maria Elisabeth von Kuefstein, a daughter of Count Johann Adam von Kuefstein, in 1791. After her death in 1796, he married Countess Maria Josepha von Abensberg and Traun, a daughter of Johann Otto, 8th Count of Abensberg and Traun, in 1798. After her death in 1799, he married his niece, Countess Krisztina "Christina" Zichy de Zich et Vásonkeő, the daughter of his sister, Countess Anna Maria, and Count Károly Zichy, in 1812.
- Countess Maria Karolina Ferdinanda von Khevenhüller-Metsch (1763–1858), who married Giuseppe Antonio Maria Soresina Vidoni, Marchese di San Giovanni in Croce (he became later a Prince), a son of Cesare Francesco Soresina Vidoni, Marchese di San Giovanni in Croce, and Dorotea Soresina Pallavicini.
- Countess Marie Leopoldina von Khevenhüller-Metsch (1764–1845), who married, as his second wife, Francesco Ruspoli, 3rd Prince of Cerveteri, son of Alessandro Ruspoli, 2nd Prince of Cerveteri.

After her death in 1787, he married Countess Marie Josephine Henriette Barbara Strassoldo (1769–1837), a daughter of Count Vinzenz Strassoldo and Amalia di Valvasone. Her brother was Count Giulio Strassoldo di Sotto, the Governor of the Illyrian Provinces in Ljubljana and the Governor of Lombardy. He purchased a Stradivarius violin made in 1733 for his second wife, which is today known as The Khevenhüller. It changed hands many times and, as of 2005, was worth $4 million.

The Prince of Khevenhüller-Metsch died on 15 June 1801 at Klagenfurt am Wörthersee, Carinthia. He was succeeded by his eldest son, Karl. When he died without issue in 1823, the title passed to his second son, Franz.

=== Descendants ===
Through his son Franz, he was a grandfather of Richard, 5th Prince of Khevenhüller-Metsch (1813–1877), who married Countess Antonia Maria Lichnowsky (a daughter of Prince Eduard Lichnowsky von Woschütz).

Through his daughter Leopoldina, he was a grandfather of Alessandro Ruspoli, 4th Prince of Cerveteri (1784–1842), Prince Camillo Ruspoli, Duke of Sueca (1788–1864), and Prince Bartolomeo Ruspoli and Khevenhüller-Metsch (1800–1872), among others.

Diplomatic posts
Preceded by Georg Adam von Starhemberg	Habsburg Ambassador to Portugal; 1756–1760	Succeeded by Johann Baptist von Keil
Preceded by Florimond Claude von Mercy-Argenteau	Habsburg Ambassador to Sardinia-Piedmont; 1763–1770	Succeeded by Philipp von Welsperg-Raitenau
Preceded by	Habsburg Ambassador to the Duchy of Milan; 1775–1782	Succeeded by
