= Johann Adolf von Metsch =

Johann Adolf von Metsch Count von Metsch
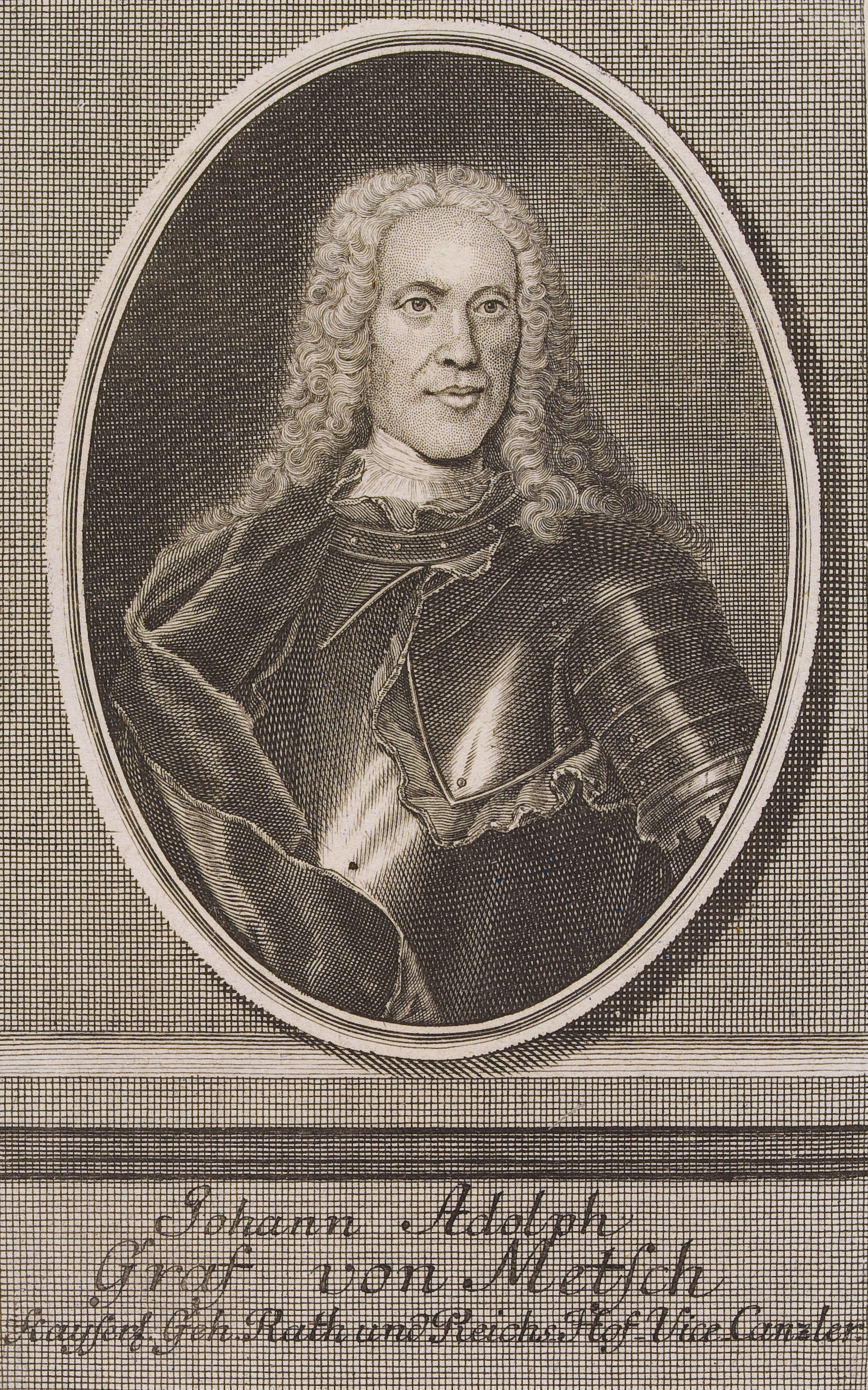
- Lithograph of Count von Metsch, 1739

Imperial Vice-Chancellor of the Holy Roman Empire
- In office 1734–1740
- Monarch: Charles VI
- Preceded by: Friedrich Karl von Schönborn
- Succeeded by: Johann Georg von Königsfeld

Personal details
- Born: 10 November 1672 Polenzko, Anhalt-Bitterfeld
- Died: 28 November 1740 (aged 68) Vienna, Archduchy of Austria
- Spouse: Baroness Maria Ernestine von Aufsess (m. 1708; died 1740)
- Relations: Johann, 2nd Prince of Khevenhüller-Metsch (grandson)
- Children: Countess Karolina; Countess Maria Anna; Countess Maria Aloisia

Count Johann Adolf von Metsch (10 November 1672 – 28 November 1740) was an Austrian Imperial Vice-Chancellor.

== Early life ==
Johann Adolf was born on 10 November 1672 at Polenzko, Anhalt-Bitterfeld, Holy Roman Empire. He was the son of Johann Ernst von Metsch (1629–1710) and Eleonore Dorothea von Thumbschirn. His sister, Johanna Sophie von Metzsch, married Kaspar Otto von Knoblauch. His father was created Baron in 1699, Count, District Administrator, and Sub-Director of the Principality of Anhalt in 1703.

His paternal grandparents were Joachim von Metsch and Hyppolita Brandt von Lindau. His maternal grandparents were Wilhelm Abraham von Thumbschirn and Dorothea Vitzthum von Eckstedt.

He studied law in Leipzig and then entered the service of the Emperor, first in Ansbach.

== Career ==
In 1719 Metsch became Ambassador to the Imperial Circle of Lower Saxony. In 1729, he became Vice President of the Imperial Court Council. From 1729 to 1731, he also represented the Imperial Vice Chancellor Friedrich Karl von Schönborn-Buchheim, who was staying in his Bishopric of Würzburg. In 1734, Metsch succeeded him as Imperial Vice Chancellor (German: Reichsvizekanzler) of the Holy Roman Empire under Emperor Charles VI. Three years later, Rudolph Joseph von Colloredo, was appointed his substitute. The latter was also granted the right of succession.

He served until the death of the Emperor in 1740, which led to the War of the Austrian Succession. Metsch died in 1740 shortly after the death of Emperor. Upon the election of Charles VII as Emperor, Johann Georg von Königsfeld initially became Imperial Vice Chancellor.

== Personal life ==
In 1708, Johann Adolf was married to Baroness Maria Ernestina Philippine Theresia von und zu Aufsess (1691–1753), a daughter of Baron Christoph Wilhelm von Aufsess and Baroness Anna Sophia Schifer von und zu Freiling auf Daxberg. He converted to Catholicism. Together, they were the parents of:

- Countess Karolina Maria Augusta von Metsch (1707–1784), who married Johann von Khevenhüller, in 1728; he was created 1st Prince of Khevenhüller-Metsch in 1764.
- Countess Maria Anna von Metsch (1711–1732), who married Franz de Paula Anton Flavius Lamberg-Ottenstein. After her death, he married Mária Józsefa Eleonora Esterházy de Galántha, a daughter of Joseph Anton, 3rd Prince Esterházy and sister to Paul II Anton, Prince Esterházy.
- Countess Maria Aloisia Ludovika von Metsch (1720–1762), who married Count Josef Wilhelm von Nostitz-Rokitnitz.

Johann Adolf died on 28 November 1740 in Vienna, then a part of the Archduchy of Austria.
