= Burgruine Rothenthurn =

Castle in Austria

Coordinates: 46.763°N 13.585°E

- Carinthia, Austria
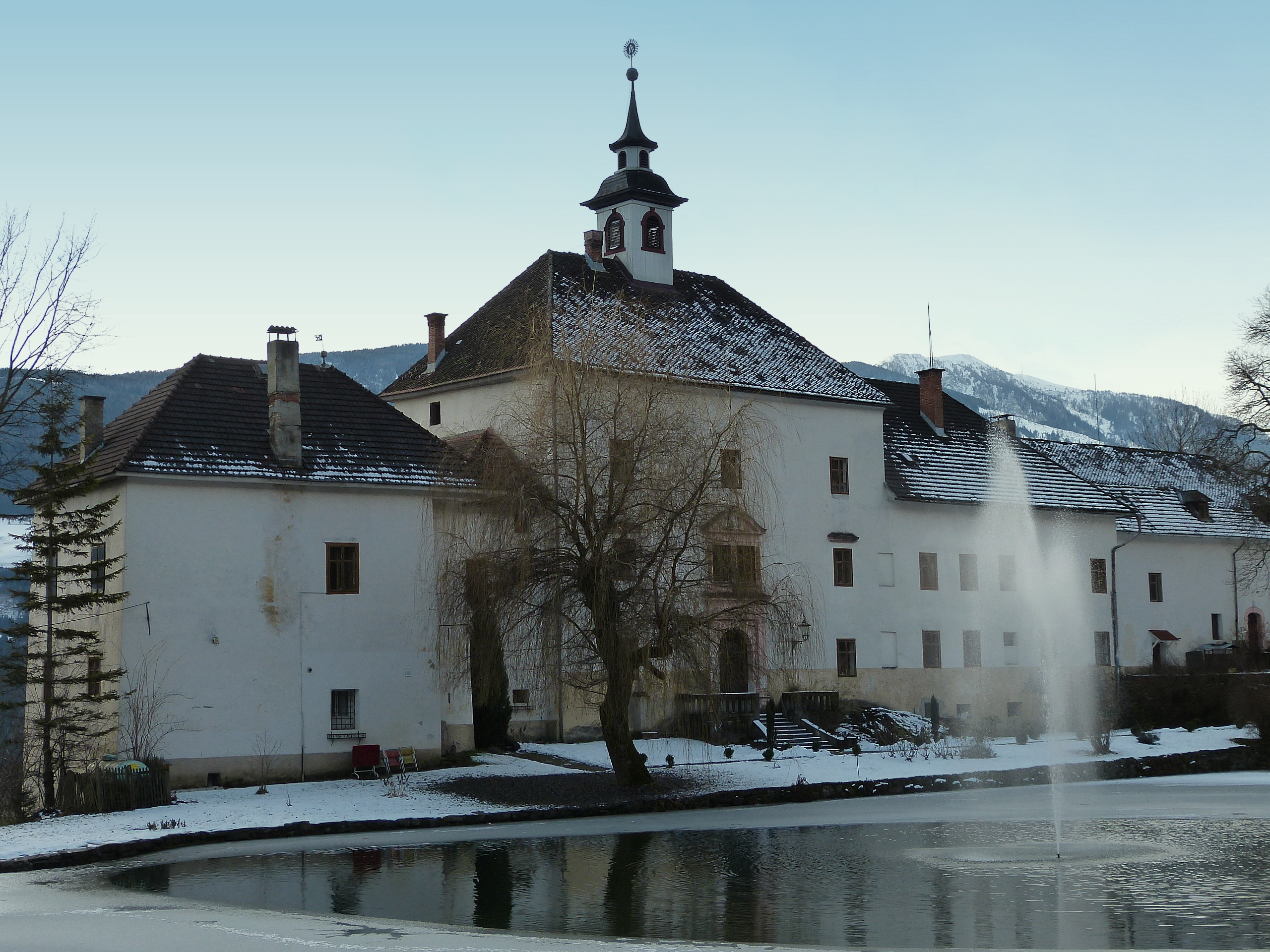

Site information
- Type: Castle

Rothenthurn is a castle in the municipality of Spittal an der Drau in Carinthia, Austria.

== History ==
Once a Carinthian estate of the Counts of Ortenburg and their successors, the Counts of Celje, a "red tower" (German: Roter Turm) at the site above the Drava Valley may have existed since the 11th century. A castle is documented in 1478, when the area was held by the Meinhardiner House of Gorizia. The present-day Renaissance building with its chapel was erected from the early 16th onwards, it was acquired by Christoph Khevenhüller about 1525 and afterwards in the possession of several local nobles over the centuries. Today the owners run the castle as a lodging establishment.

== See also ==
- List of castles in Austria
