= Symphony No. 2 (Beethoven) =

Musical work by Beethoven, composed 1801–1802

- by Ludwig van Beethoven
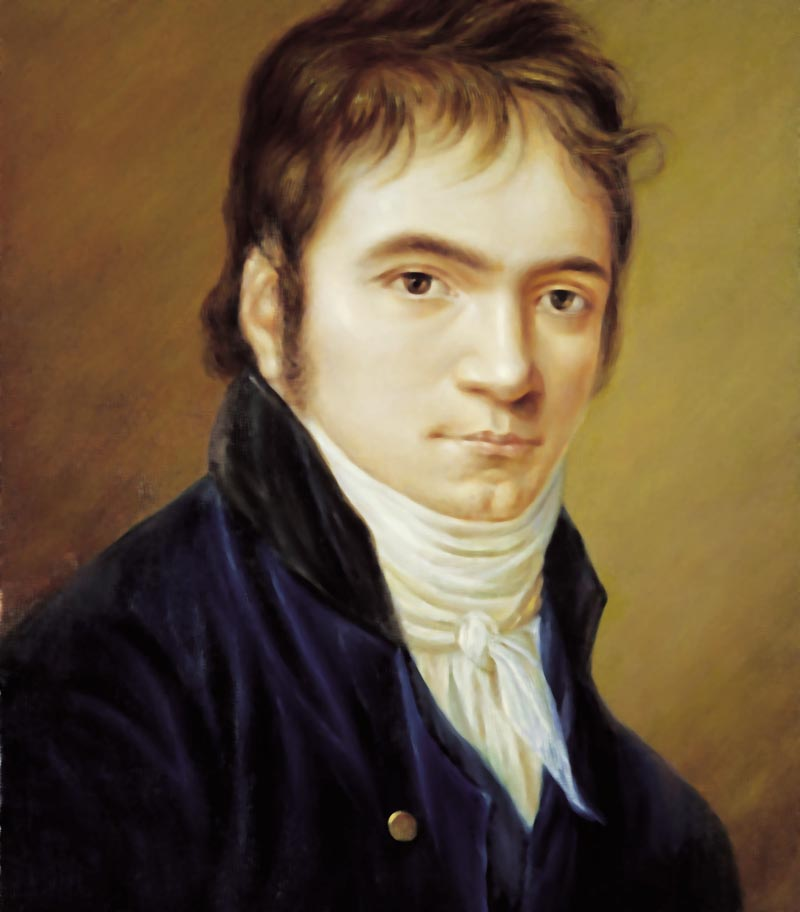
- Portrait of the composer in 1803, the year of the symphony's premiere
- Key: D major
- Opus: 36
- Style: Classical period
- Composed: 1801–1802
- Dedication: Karl Alois, Prince Lichnowsky
- Performed: 5 April 1803: Vienna
- Duration: 30–37 minutes
- Movements: Four

Premiere
- Date: 5 April 1803
- Location: Theater an der Wien, Vienna
- Conductor: Ludwig van Beethoven

The Symphony No. 2 in D major, Op. 36, is a symphony in four movements written by Ludwig van Beethoven between 1801 and 1802. The work is dedicated to Karl Alois, Prince Lichnowsky.

== Background ==
Beethoven's 2nd Symphony was mostly written during his stay at Heiligenstadt in 1802, at a time when his deafness was becoming more pronounced and he began to realize that it might be incurable. The work was premiered in the Theater an der Wien in Vienna on 5 April 1803, and was conducted by the composer. During that same concert, the Third Piano Concerto and the oratorio Christ on the Mount of Olives were also debuted. It is one of the last works of Beethoven's early period.

Beethoven wrote the 2nd Symphony without a standard minuet; instead, a scherzo took its place, giving the composition even greater scope and energy. The scherzo and the finale are filled with Beethovenian musical jokes, which shocked the sensibilities of many contemporary critics. One Viennese critic for the Zeitung für die elegante Welt (Newspaper for the Elegant World) wrote of the symphony, "The 2nd symphony is a crass ogre, a stabbed, unbound writhing dragon that refuses to die, and although bleeding in the Finale, angrily beats about with tail erect."

== Instrumentation ==
The symphony is scored for two flutes, two oboes, two clarinets in A, two bassoons, two horns in D, E and A, two trumpets in D (first, third and fourth movements only), timpani (first, third and fourth movements only) and strings.

Ferdinand Ries, working under Beethoven, made a transcription of the entire symphony for piano trio which bears the same opus number. Johann Nepomuk Hummel also made a transcription for a piano quartet with a flute in around 1825.

== Form ==
I. Adagio molto – Allegro con brio

II. Larghetto

III. Scherzo: Allegro – Trio

IV. Allegro molto
Performed by the Tsumugi Orchestra conducted by Takashi Inoue (2011)

This symphony consists of 4 movements:

1. Adagio molto, 3/4 – Allegro con brio, 4/4 (D major)
2. Larghetto, 3/8 (A major)
3. Scherzo: Allegro – Trio, 3/4 (D major)
4. Allegro molto, 2/2 (D major)

A typical performance runs 30 to 37 minutes.

=== I. Adagio molto – Allegro con brio ===
The introduction, Adagio molto, begins in D major, changing to B♭ major in measure 11. In measures 12 to 16, it briefly modulates to B♭ major and immediately back to D. The exposition (Allegro con brio) begins in D major in measure 34 with the A theme, played by the violas and cellos, which lasts until measure 57.

A transition towards the B theme lasts until measure 72, modulating to A minor at measure 61. The B theme begins in A major at 73, moving to A minor again at 113 with a codetta from measures 117 to 136 (moving to D major in measure 120). The development uses material from the A theme, going through several modulations throughout and making use of the main idea from Theme A in sequence. At measure 216, the A theme returns in the recapitulation, lasting until measure 228. There is a transition from 229 to 244, bringing back the B theme at measure 245, this time in the tonic key. At 327, B♭ major returns briefly, moving back to D in 334 with a Coda from measures 340 to 360.

=== II. Larghetto ===
This movement, Larghetto, is in the dominant key of A major and is one of Beethoven's longest symphonic slow movements. There are clear indications of the influence of folk music and the pastoral, presaging his Symphony No. 6 ("Pastoral").

The movement, like the 1st, is in sonata form. It begins with the following theme, introduced by the strings:

The melody is then repeated in the woodwinds. An abundance of other themes are introduced in the exposition, ending in E major, the dominant key. The development section develops some of these melodies, modulating to distant keys such as A minor and C major. The recapitulation states all the themes again in A major, the tonic key. A short coda follows which ends the movement.

Franz Schubert quoted from the movement in the second movement of his Grand Duo for piano.

This movement is often used, but in F major, as the hymn tune "Alsace" to the words: "What various hindrances we meet".

=== III. Scherzo: Allegro ===
This movement, Scherzo: Allegro, encloses a melodious oboe and bassoon quartet within a typical-sounding Austrian side-slapping dance. This movement is a scherzo-trio in ternary form. This is the first time Beethoven used a scherzo as a 3rd movement of his symphonies (as opposed to the classical minuet in Mozart or Haydn symphonies). The scherzo contains many crotchet staccato figures being played by various instruments.

The contrasting trio starts with the oboe introducing a new melody:

This is answered by the string section which play quaver notes similar to trills. The melody then returns.

=== IV. Allegro molto ===
The 4th movement, Allegro molto, is composed of very rapid string passages. The movement is in Sonata rondo form (A–B–A–C–A–B–A). The first subject is a humorous theme that begins with a 2-note slur followed by a trill, creating a playful character.

A transition theme then follows, which is more lyrical. The second subject is quiet and humorous, with the melody in the woodwinds and the strings playing staccato figures.

The first subject reappears briefly, followed by a development section that modulates through various minor keys. The development section ends with the 2-note slur from the first subject being played repeatedly by the full orchestra.

After a brief silence, the recapitulation begins and continues normally.

The coda has been described as containing both comic and tragic elements, such as abrupt starts and stops, fake endings, chordal blasts and harmonic surprises. In the end, the tension builds and the movement ends triumphantly.

== Recordings ==
The recording by Günter Wand with the NDR Sinfonieorchester was described by a critic as "nicely balanced and shaped, with Beethoven’s dynamic nuances and inner voices shining through with luminous quality."
