= Aichelberg Castle =

Castle ruin in Austria

Aichelberg Castle (Burgruine Aichelberg)
- Carinthia, Austria
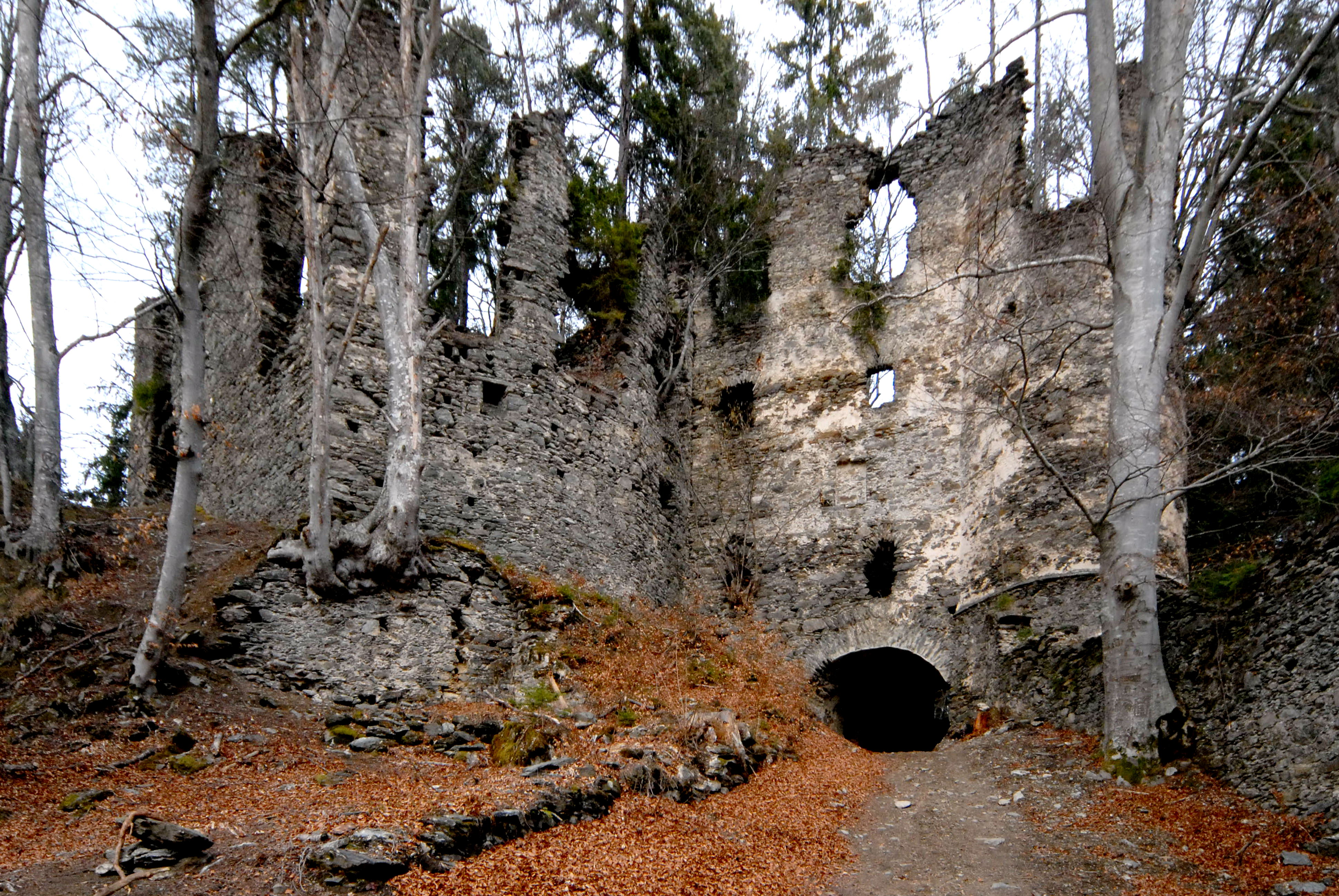

Site information
- Type: Castle

Location
- Coordinates: 46.6444°N 13.9597°E

Aichelberg Castle (German: Burgruine Aichelberg) is a castle in Carinthia, Austria. It crowns an 850 m spur in the Ossiacher Tauern, north-east of Wernberg, from which it once commanded the pre-alpine trade roads that linked the Drava valley with the interior of Carinthia. Although the masonry suggests an earlier fortification, the seat enters the written record in 1224 with the tournament knight Reinher de Eychelberc, whose family took its name from the site and served as ministeriales of the Carinthian dukes during the later thirteenth century. When the male Aichelberg line failed, Duke Ernest pledged the stronghold to Hans Khevenhüller in 1431; four years later the fief was converted into full freehold, making Aichelberg the first allodial residence of that rising dynasty.

Most of the standing masonry dates to the turbulent decades around 1500. The original late-Romanesque core was badly damaged in 1484 during Emperor Frederick III's war with King Matthias Corvinus of Hungary, and the Khevenhüller family rebuilt the complex as a compact, artillery-resistant residence with large rectangular windows and a newly vaulted palas. Contemporary accounts also record the demolition of the old bergfried in the sixteenth century, probably to rationalise the gun-platform on the summit rock. A forecourt surrounded by a stout enceinte protects the southern approach, while access to the high ward is controlled by a three-storey gate tower whose projecting round turret once housed a spiral stair. The surviving four-storey residential block preserves late-Gothic mouldings on its hooded portals and fragments of Renaissance plaster inside, attesting to the castle's gradual transition from feudal fortress to gentlemanly seat.

Economic decline and the conversion of the Khevenhüller to Protestantism forced the sale of Aichelberg to Hans Siegmund Graf von Wagensberg in 1629; by the time the historian Valvasor sketched the ruin in 1688, roofs had already collapsed and vegetation was gaining a hold. After passing to the counts Orsini-Rosenberg, the site remained abandoned until structural failure threatened total loss in the 1990s. A partnership between the owner family, the municipality of Wernberg, the Province of Carinthia and the Federal Monuments Authority launched a phased conservation campaign in 2016; the six-year project stabilised the palas, cleared invasive trees, documented medieval building phases archaeologically and installed discreet visitor infrastructure at a cost of about €600,000. Since September 2022 the castle has been open to the public from April to October, and guided "ruin walks" now present Aichelberg as a model for community-based heritage stewardship.

== See also ==
- List of castles in Austria
