= Maria Anna Stubenberg =

German composer

Maria Anna von Stubenberg, aka Maria Anna von Buttlar-Stubenberg (August 9, 1821 – December 1, 1912) was an Austrian-born composer who used Hungarian and Romani folk tunes in her compositions.

== Biography ==
Maria Anna Herrin und Gräfin Treusch von Buttlar-Brandenfels was born in Graz, Austria, to Gustav Adolf Josef Christian Felix Herr und Graf von Stubenberg and Maria Franciszka Freiin von Staudach. She married Johann Remekhazy von Gurahoncz on February 15, 1840, and Friedrich Graf von Zichy de Zich und Vásonykeö on February 22, 1848. Her married names were 1stly Remekhazy von Gurahoncz, 2ndly von Zichy de Zich und Vásonykeö and 3rdly Treusch von Buttlar-Brandenfels.

== Works ==
Stubenberg lived in the Hungarian parts of the Austrian Empire as a child, and used Hungarian and Romani folk tunes in her compositions for voice, piano, and zither. She composed works ranging through at least opus 90, using texts from folksongs and writers such as Eugen Graf Aichelburg, Rudolph Baumbach, William Bosworth, Friedrich Ferdinand, Graf von Beust, Emanuel von Geibel, Heinrich Heine, and Nikolaus Lenau. Her music was published by Josef Eberle and Wiener Musik Verlagshaus (later F. Roerich & Co.).

Selected works include:

- In mein gar zu dunkles Leben, op. 63 (Text: Heinrich Heine)
- Sie haben mich gequälet, op. 76 (Text: Heinrich Heine)
