= Károly Zichy =

Hungarian aristocrat

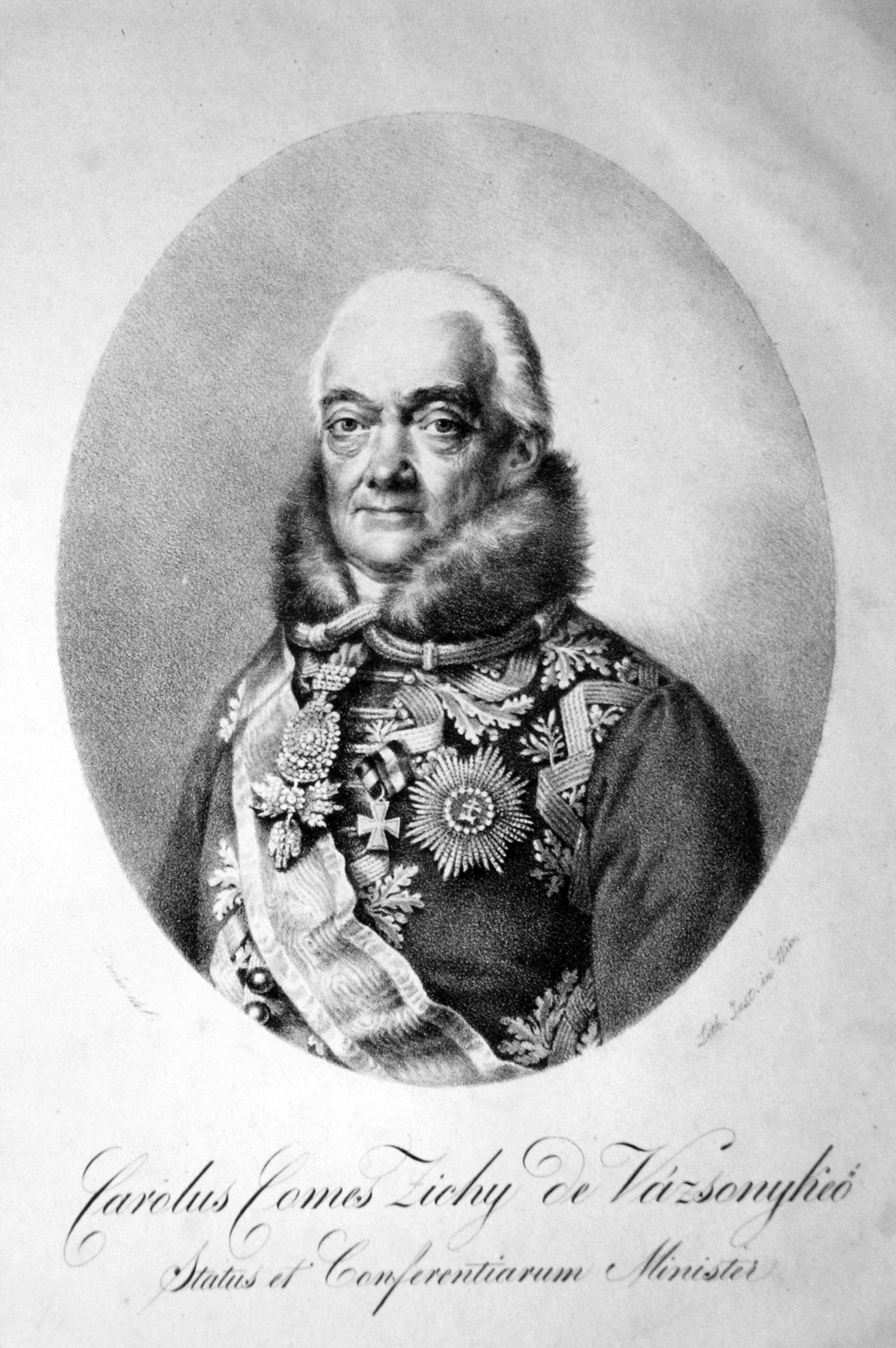

Lord Chief Justice of the Kingdom of Hungary
- In office 18 December 1788 – 21 July 1795
- Preceded by: Kristóf Niczky
- Succeeded by: Péter Végh

Personal details
- Born: Károly József Franz Xaver Kasimir Johann von Nepomuk; 4 March 1753 Pressburg
- Died: 28 September 1826 (aged 73) Vienna
- Spouse: Anna Maria Khevenhüller-Metsch (m. 1776; died 1809)
- Children: 11
- Parent(s): István Zichy; Cecilia von Stubenberg

Count Károly József Franz Xaver Kasimir Johann von Nepomuk Zichy de Zich et Vásonkeő (4 March 1753 – 28 September 1826) was a Hungarian aristocrat, who served as Austrian war minister in 1809 and minister of the interior from 1813 to 1814.

== Early life ==
Count Zichy was born in Pressburg on 4 March 1753. He was the son of Count István Zichy de Zich et Vásonkeő (1715–1769), and Countess Marie Cecilie von Stubenberg (1725–1763).

His paternal grandparents were Count János Zichy and Maria Anna von Thalheim. His great-grandfather, Count István Zichy de Zich et Vásonkeő, obtained the title of Imperial Count for the Zichy family.

Count Zichy was educated at the Theresianum in Vienna.

== Career ==
Count Zichy became an Imperial and Royal chamberlain, and held various offices. In 1782, Joseph II appointed him as the Chief Governor of Békés County as a Court Councilor and referendarius. In 1785, he became a treasurer and president of the chamber, then in 1788, a regional judge and president of the Council of Governors. A member of the House of Magnates from 1790 until his death, he was one of the supporters of the constitutional compromise at the 1790 Diet of Hungary. In 1792, he received the Grand Cross of the Order of Saint Stephen.

From 1802, he was president of the Court Chamber, in 1808, president of the Ministry of State, in 1808, Knight of the Order of the Golden Fleece, in 1809, Imperial Minister of War, and from 1813 to 1814, Imperial Minister of the Interior. In 1821, on the occasion of the half-century jubilee of his official position, he received the diamonds of the Order of Saint Stephen.

He translated two works by René Rapin into German.

== Personal life ==
On 12 February 1776 in Vienna, Zichy married Countess Anna Maria Khevenhüller-Metsch (1759–1809), a daughter of Johann Sigismund Friedrich von Khevenhüller-Metsch, 2nd Prince von Khevenhüller-Metsch, and Princess Maria Amalia Susanna of Liechtenstein (daughter of Prince Emanuel of Liechtenstein). Together, they were the parents of eleven children, including:

- Count Ferenc Zichy (1777–1839), who married Countess Mária Wilhelmine de Ferraris, a daughter of Count Joseph de Ferraris, in 1799.
- Count Károly Antal Zichy (1779–1834), who was Governor of Moson County; he married Countess Franciska Eszterházy de Galántha in 1800. After her death in 1804, he married Countess Júlia Festetics de Tolna in 1806. After her death in 1816, he married Countess Crescence Seilern in 1819.
- Countess Amália Zichy (1782–1819), who married Ferenc Viczay de Loós et Hédervár, in 1800.
- Count Ferdinánd Zichy (1783–1862), a Field-marshal who was condemned to ten years' imprisonment for surrendering Venice to the insurgents in 1848; he married Countess Zsófia Széchenyi, a daughter of Count Ferenc Széchényi and Countess Julianna Festetics de Tolna in 1807.
- Countess Maria Adelheid Zichy (1788–1839), who married Count János Keglevich von Buzin, a son of Count Károly Keglevich von Buzin and Countess Julia Katalin Maria Josefa Zichy.
- Countess Krisztina Zichy (1792–1830), who married, as his third wife, her uncle Franz, 4th Prince of Khevenhüller-Metsch, in 1812.
- Countess Eleonora Zichy (1795–1873), who married Eduárd Lichnowsky, son of Karl Alois, Prince Lichnowsky and Countess Maria Christiane von Thun und Hohenstein, in 1813.
- Count Miklós Zichy (1796–1856), who married Baroness Julianna von Loë, a daughter of Edmund von Loë-Imstenraedt and Marie Alexandrine von Merveldt, in 1820.
- Countess Karoline Zichy (1802–1885), who died unmarried.

Count Zichy died in Vienna on 28 September 1826 and was buried in Oroszvár.

=== Descendants ===
Through his son Ferenc, he was a grandfather of Countess Emilia Zichy-Ferraris (1803–1866), who was the second wife of Count Pál Széchényi, and Countess Melanie Zichy-Ferraris (1805–1854), who was the third wife of Prince Klemens von Metternich (parents of Princess Melanie Metternich-Zichy).
