= Khevenhüller family =

Carinthian noble family

House of Khevenhüller-Metsch
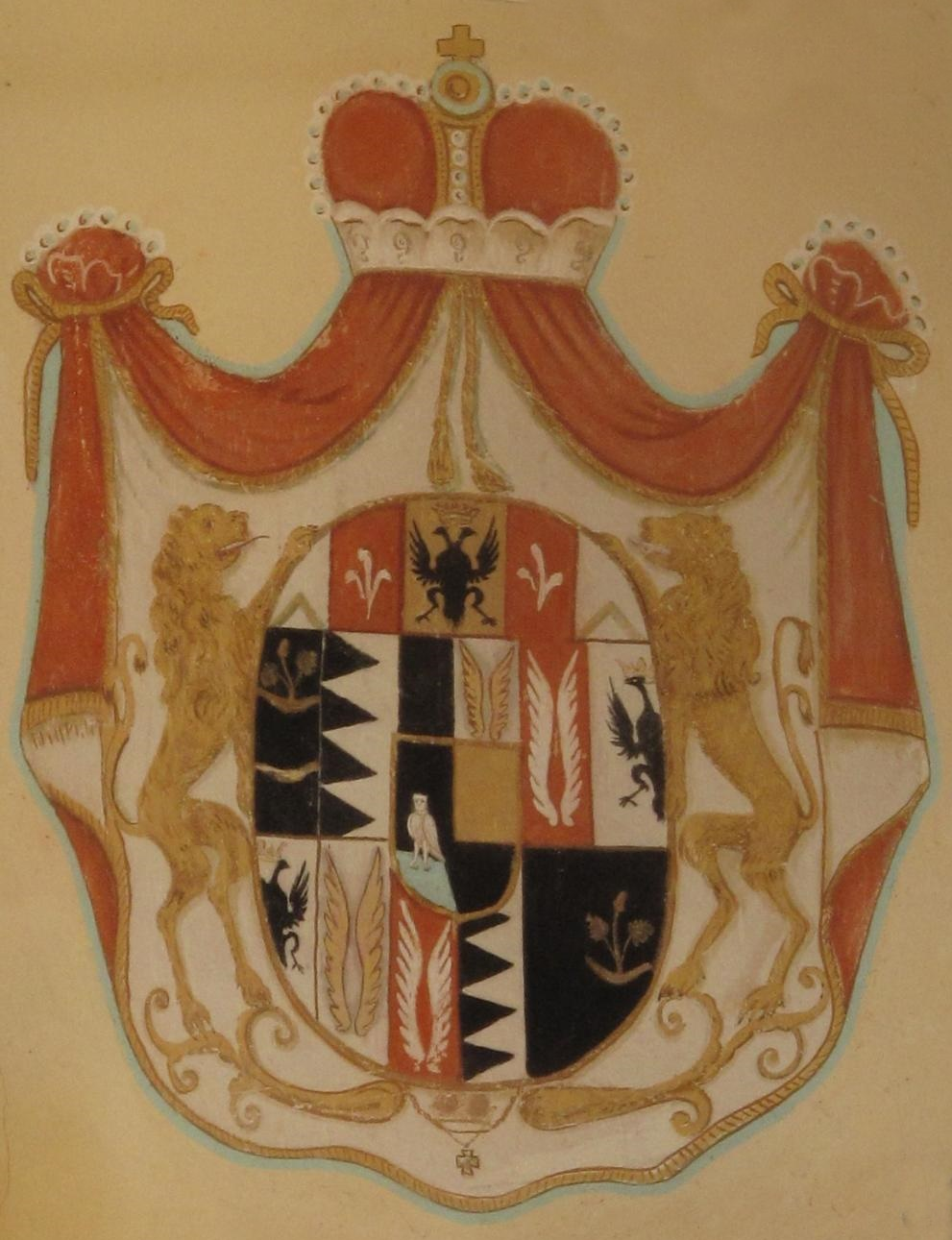
- Coat of arms of the Princes of Khevenhüller-Metsch
- Founded: 14th century
- Current head: S.D. Fürst Bartolomeus von Khevenhüller-Metsch
- Titles: Freiherren (1566); Imperial Counts (Reichsgrafen) of Khevenhüller-Frankenburg (1593); Imperial Counts of Khevenhüller-Hochosterwitz (1725); Princes of Khevenhüller-Metsch (1763)
- Style: Serene Highness

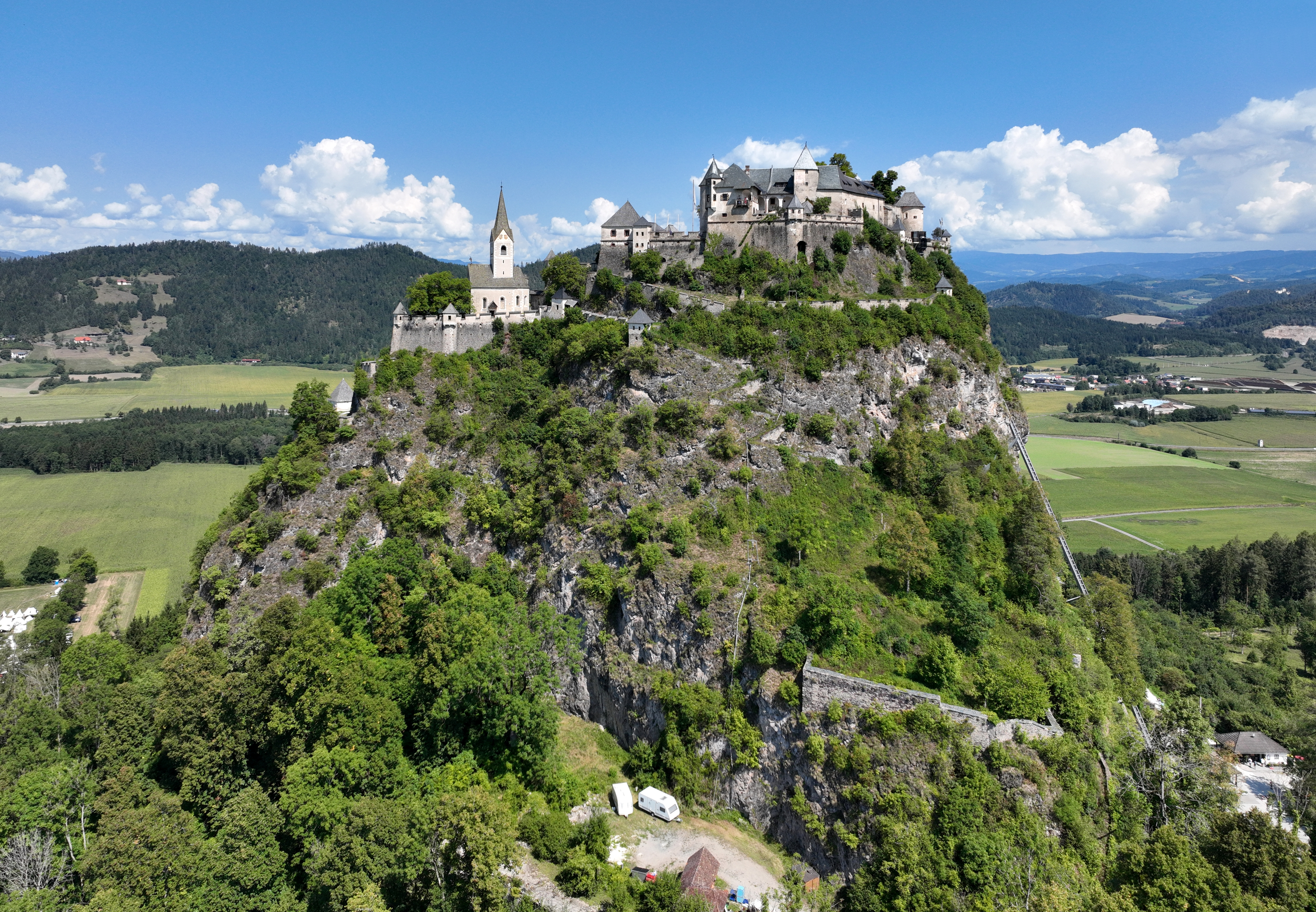
Hochosterwitz Castle

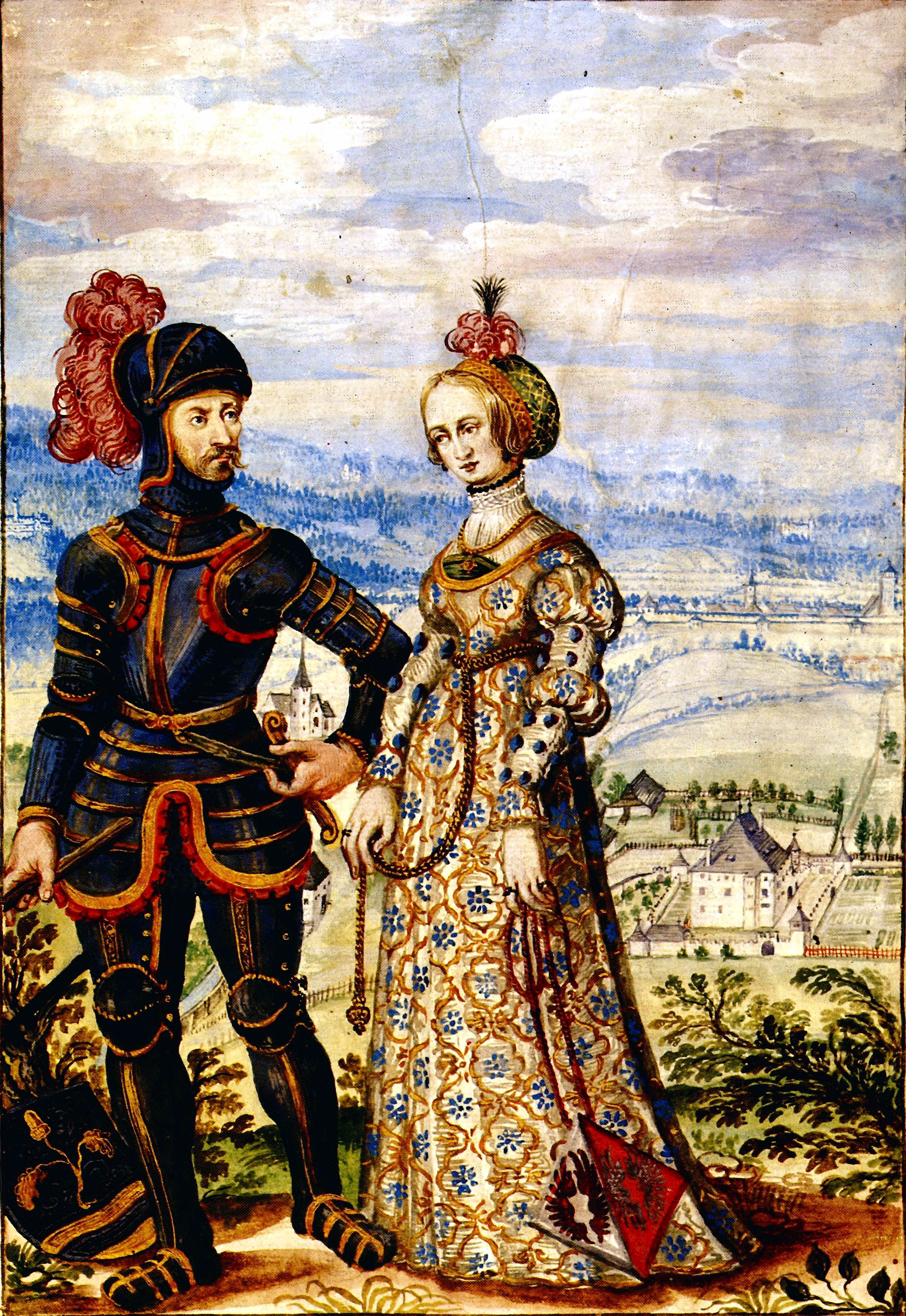
Knight Ulrich (ca. 1430–1492) and his wife Anna née von Kellerberg with Mörtenegg Castle and the church of St. Martin nr. Villach.

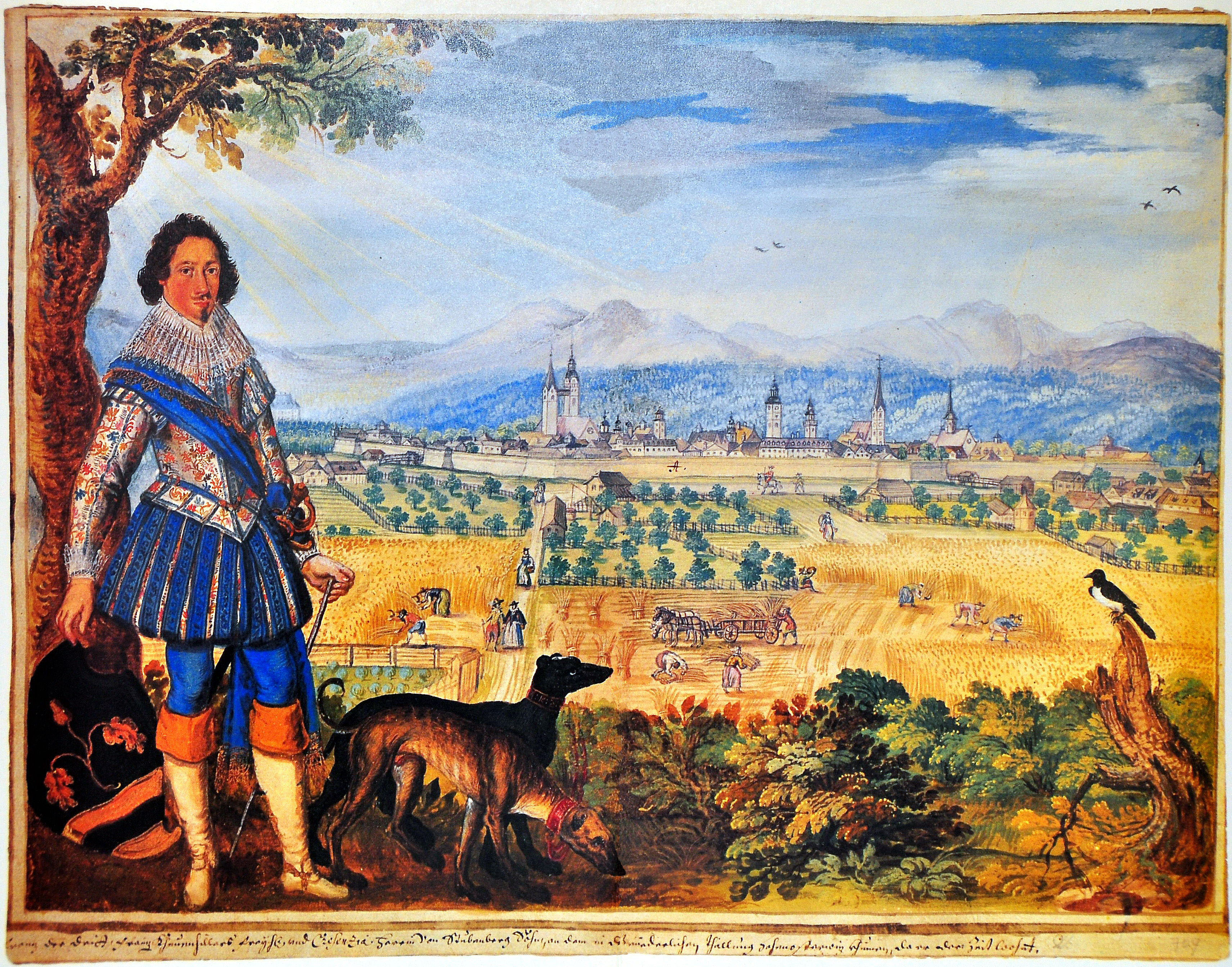
Baron Franz III Khevenhüller and Klagenfurt am Wörthersee, ca. 1615

The House of Khevenhüller, one of Austria’s most distinguished princely houses, documented in Carinthia since 1356, with its ancestral seat at Landskron Castle. In the 16th century, the family split into the two branches of Khevenhüller-Frankenburg, Imperial Counts (i.e. immediate counts of the Holy Roman Empire) from 1593, and Khevenhüller-Hochosterwitz, raised to Imperial Counts in 1725 and, as Khevenhüller-Metsch, to princely rank (Fürsten) in 1763. The family was mediatised in 1806 and therefore belongs to high nobility.

In the present-day Austrian state of Carinthia, the princely family of Khevenhüller-Metsch owns the Renaissance castle of Hochosterwitz, a significant edifice and major tourist attraction.

== History ==
The noble family originally possibly originated in Kevenhüll (today part of Beilngries) in Franconia; they were vassals of the Bishops of Bamberg, who had received large estates in Carinthia from the hands of King Henry II of Germany in 1007. The earliest mention refers to one Ulreich dem Chevenhuelaer in a 1330 deed. In Carinthia, a continuous line descends from one Johann I (Hans) Khevenhüller, who died in 1356 and was the son-in-law of Richard I von Khünburg and Elisabeth von Himmelberg, both from Carinthia.

Johann IV von Khevenhüller zu Aichelberg (born ca 1420-1462) was the first to hold the family lordship of Aichelberg. His son, Johann V Khevenhüller (died 1462), son of Wilhelm II Khevenhüller and Margareta von Auersperg, was Burgrave of Federaun, and his son, Augustin Khevenhüller, who died 1516, was the Lord of Hardegg. His mother was one "Miss" von Lindegg, who together with her grandson Sigismund III, Herr Khevenhüller in Hohen-Osterwitz (1507–1558) appears among the ancestors of King Charles III. Her youngest grandson, Bernard von Khevenhüller (1511–1548) was the Lord of Sternberg and Hohenwart; her eldest grandson, Christoph Khevenhüller (1503–1557) was Lord of Aichelberg.

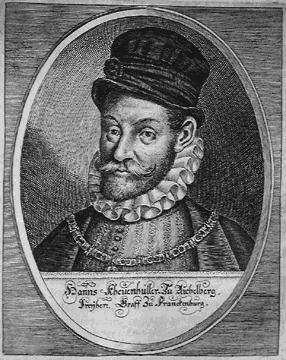
Hans Khevenhüller, ambassador to the Spanish Court

=== Christoph Khevenhüller ===
The steep rise of the House of Khevenhüller in Carinthia began when in 1525 Christoph Khevenhüller (1503–57) was appointed castellan of Ortenburg Castle near Spittal an der Drau and married a wealthy burgher's daughter, Elizabeth Mansdorfer.

Her wealth enabled him to acquire a number of properties in Carinthia such as the castles of Aichelberg, Ortenburg, Sommeregg, Hochosterwitz and Landskron as well as the iron mine of Eisentratten near Gmünd. Like the majority of the Carinthian Estates, Christoph Khevenhüller became a Lutheran Protestant. Of Christoph Khevenhüller's three sons, Hans, Moritz and Bartlmäus, two were politically and economically most successful, thus furthering the rise of the family:

=== Hans Khevenhüller ===
Hans Khevenhüller (1538–1606) became the Legate of the Holy Roman Emperor at the Spanish court, an office that he held for 26 years. Educated at the University of Padua, he knew Latin and Italian. He was appointed Imperial Chamberlain, was made a Knight of the Order of the Golden Fleece in 1587 and a count in 1593, a rank that upon his death passed on to his brother Bartlmäus. During his lifetime, he sought and collected animals and plants of economic importance from many parts of the world.

=== Bartlmäus Khevenhüller ===
The activities of Bartlmäus Khevenhüller (1539–1613) centred on Carinthia. Styling himself "Freiherr auf Landskron and Wernberg" he made it to Burggrave und Speaker of the Estates, and managed to make the Khevenhüller family one of the wealthiest in the German Reich. He also figured as the head of the Protestants in Carinthia.

When in the course of the Counter-Reformation Emperor Ferdinand II abolished the nobility's religious freedom in the Habsburg lands, the Protestant members of the Khevenhüller family were forced to abandon their possessions in Carinthia and emigrated to Germany in 1628. Among these was also the great-grandmother of Nicolaus Ludwig Reichsgraf von Zinzendorf und Pottendorf of the Moravian Church or Herrnhuter Brüdergemeine. Interrelation with the noble Saxonian Metzsch family began that led to the Khevenhüller-Metsch branch, which later also spread to Spain where as marquesses and dukes they became Grandees of Spain.

=== Paul Khevenhüller ===
A Protestant, Paul Khevenhüller (1593–1655) sided with the Swedish king during the Thirty Years' War lending Gustav Adolf 70,000 Swedish riksdalers to finance the war. After the king's death the Swedish state was incapable of repaying the loan and compensated the lender with the property of Julita Gård in Södermanland, which remained the residence of his descendants late into the 19th century.

== Notable members of the House of Khevenhüller ==
- Ulrich Khevenhüller (b. ca. 1430–1492), youngest son of Hans II Khevenhüller, knight
- George Khevenhüller (1533–1587), "State Captain", i.e. governor of the Duchy of Carinthia.
- Hans Graf Khevenhüller-Frankenburg (1538–1606), Imperial ambassador to the Spanish Court.
- Franz Christoph Graf von Khevenhüller-Frankenburg (1588–1650), Imperial ambassador to the Spanish Court
- Paul Khevenhüller (1593–1655), financier of the Swedish king in the Thirty Years' War
- Sigmund Friedrich von Khevenhüller (1666–1742), governor of the Duchy of Carinthia, vicegerent of the Duchy of Lower Austria.

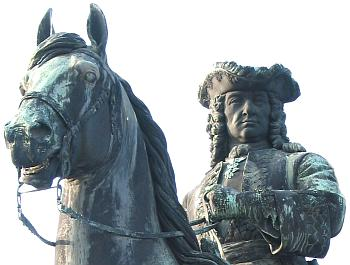
Ludwig Andreas Graf Khevenhüller, field marshal. (Part of the Maria-Theresa monument in Vienna)

- Ludwig Andreas Khevenhüller Graf von Aichelberg-Frankenburg (1683–1744), Austrian field marshal
- Johann Joseph von Khevenhüller-Metsch (1706–1776), Lord Great Chamberlain ("Oberstkämmerer") of Maria Theresa
- Johann Carl Khevenhüller (1839–1905), member of Maximilian I of Mexico's corps of volunteers

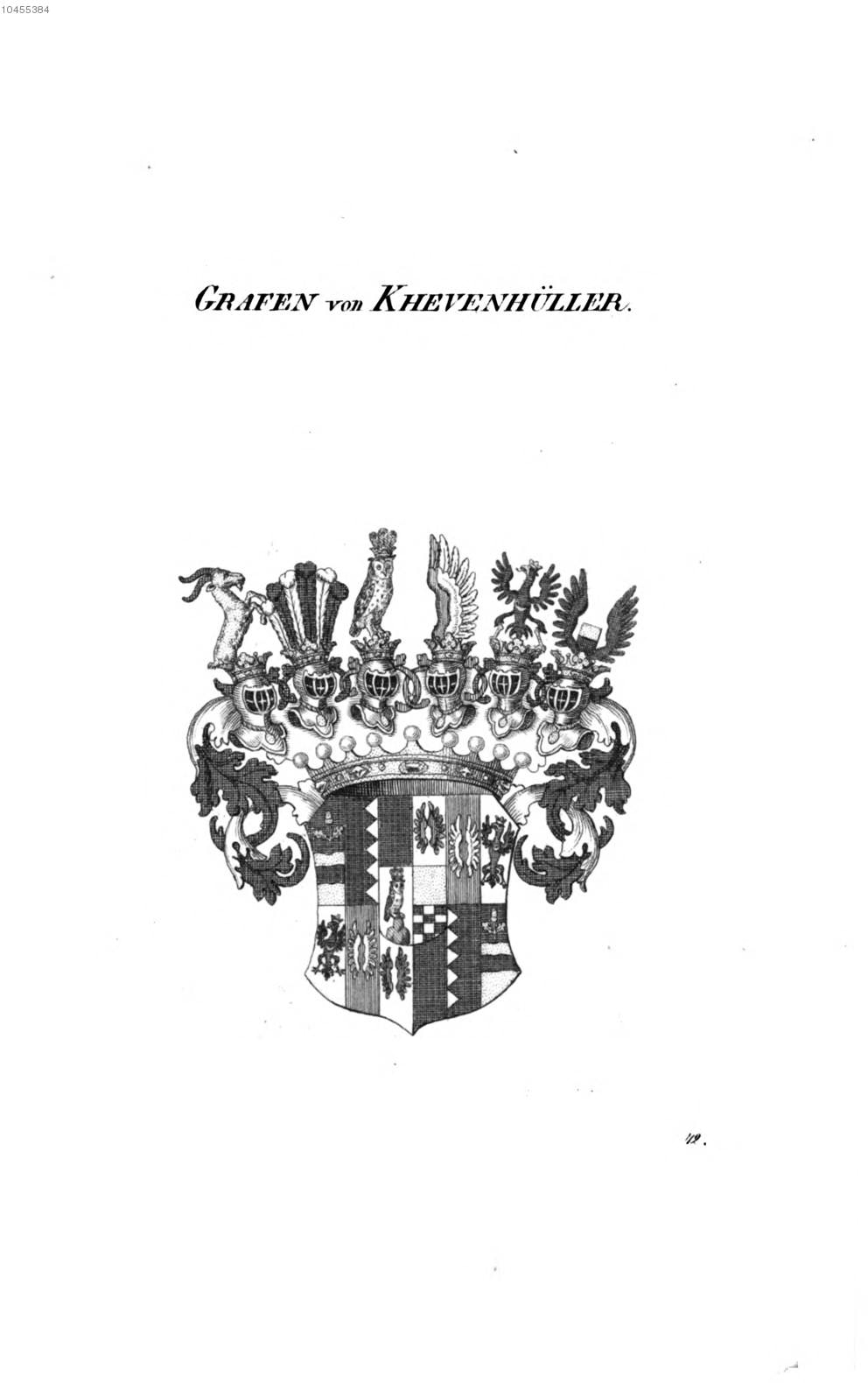
Arms of the Counts of Khevenhüller

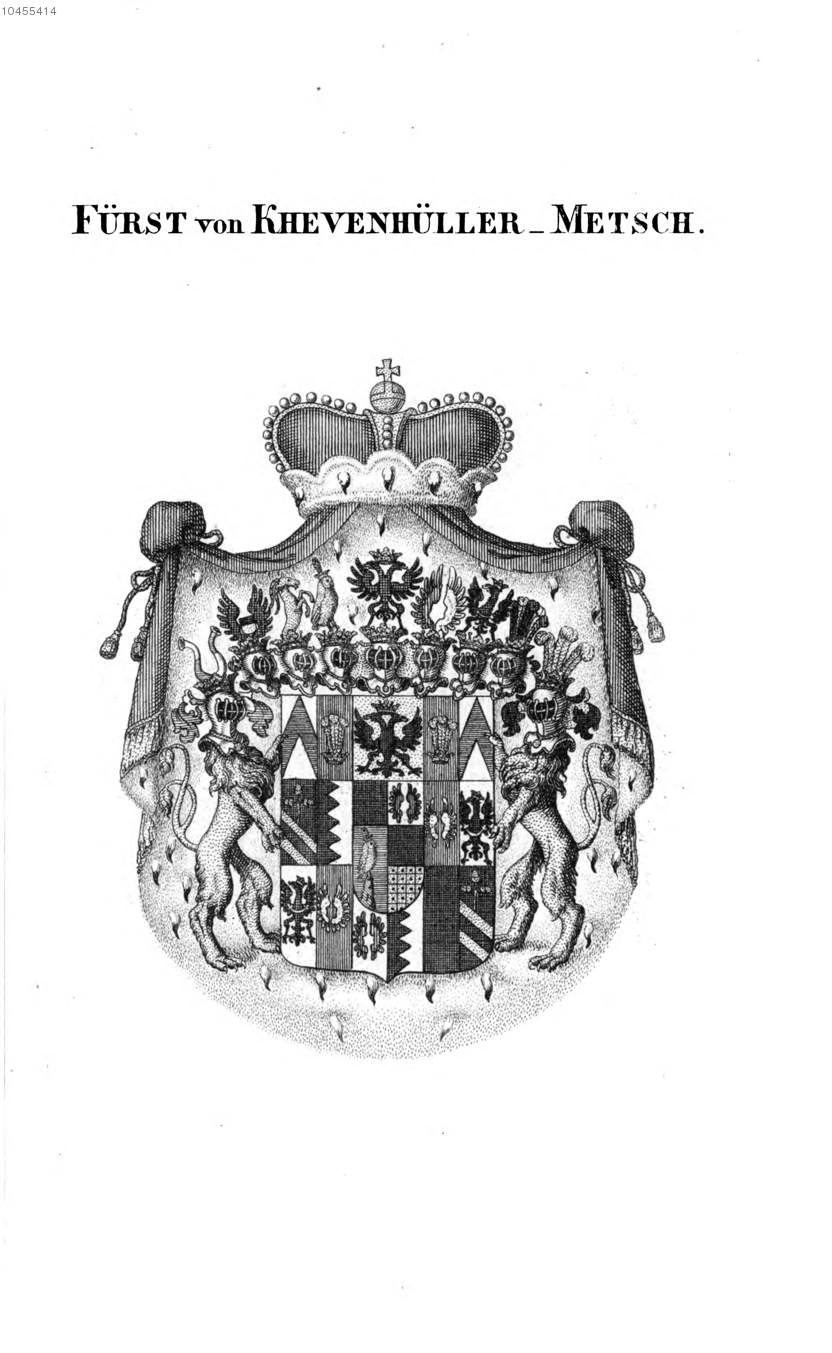
Princes of Khevenhüller-Metsch

== Princes of Khevenhüller-Metsch (Fürst von Khevenhüller-Metsch) ==
- Johann Joseph (1706–1776), son of the former, created 1st Prince of Khevenhüller-Metsch in 1763; married Countess Karolina Maria Augustina von Metsch (daughter of Count Johann Adolf von Metsch).
- Johann Sigismund Friedrich (1732–1801), son of the former, 2nd Prince of Khevenhüller-Metsch; married (1) Princess Maria Amalia Susanna of Liechtenstein (daughter of Prince Emanuel of Liechtenstein); married (2) Countess Marie Josephine Henriette Barbara Strassoldo (daughter of Count Vinzenz Strassoldo).
- Karl Maria Joseph Johann Baptist Clemens (1756–1823), son of the former, 3rd Prince of Khevenhüller-Metsch; married Countess Therese of Morzin (daughter of Count Karl Joseph of Morzin).
- Franz Maria Johann Joseph Hermann (1762–1837), brother of the former, 4th Prince of Khevenhüller-Metsch; married (1) Countess Maria Elisabeth von Kuefstein (daughter of Count Johann Adam von Kuefstein); married (2) Coutness Maria Josepha von Abensberg and Traun (daughter of Count Otto von Abensberg and Traun); married (3) Countess Krisztina "Christina" Zichy de Zich et Vásonkeő (daughter of Count Károly Zichy de Zich et Vásonkeő).
- Richard Maria Johann Basil (1813–1877), son of the former, 5th Prince of Khevenhüller-Metsch; married Countess Antonia Maria Lichnowsky (daughter of Prince Eduard Lichnowsky von Woschütz).
- Johann Franz Karl Eduard Joseph Nemesius (1839–1905), son of the former, 6th Prince of Khevenhüller-Metsch; married Countess Eduardine von Clam-Gallas (daughter of Count Eduard von Clam-Gallas).
- Anton Sigismund Joseph Maria (1873–1945), nephew of the former, until 1919 (abolition of aristocratic titles) the 7th Prince of Khevenhüller-Metsch; married Countess Gabriele von Mensdorff-Pouilly (daughter of Count Alphons von Mensdorff-Pouilly).
- Franz Eduard Joseph Adam Othmar Leopold Hubertus Maria (1889–1977), hereditary 8th Prince of Khevenhüller-Metsch; married Princess Anna von Fürstenberg (daughter of Maximilian Egon II, Prince of Fürstenberg).
- Maximilian Alfred Bartholomäus Friedrich Anton Franz Eduard Joachim Anna Maria Schnee Oswald Hubertus (1919–2010), hereditary 9th Prince of Khevenhüller-Metsch; married Countess Wilhelmine Henckel von Donnersmarck (daughter of Count Lazarus Henckel von Donnersmarck and Countess Franziska von und zu Eltz).
- Johannes (1956–2020), hereditary 10th Prince of Khevenhüller-Metsch; married Doña Camilla Borghese dei Principi di Nettuno (daughter of Don Giovanni-Angelo Borghese dei Principi di Nettuno and Doña Lydia dei Conti Cremisini). They have only daughters but no sons.

== Current head of the Khevenhüller-Metsch family ==
- Bartolomäus (born as Maria Bartolomäus Lazarus Maximilian Hubertus Graf von Khevenhüller-Metsch; 1958), hereditary 11th Prince of Khevenhüller-Metsch; married Doña Cristina Sanchez de Movellán y Garcia Ogara (second daughter of Don Manuel Sánchez de Movellán Hupfel, Marqués de Movellán).
- Maximilian, 9th Prince 1977-2010 (1919-2010)
  - Johannes, 10th Prince 2010-2020 (1956-2020)
  - Bartolomäus, 11th Prince 2020–present (b. 1958)
    - Graf Ludwig Andreas (b. 1988)
    - Graf Philipp (b. 1998)
  - Graf Karl Maximilian (b. 1959)
    - Graf Maximilian (b. 1993)
    - Graf Franz Christoph (b. 1995)
    - Graf Sigismund (b. 1997)
  - Graf Georg (b. 1960)

== Spanish descendants ==
- Don Camillo Ruspoli y Khevenhüller-Metsch, Duke of Sueca (1788–1864), married Carlota de Godoy, 2nd Duchess of Sueca
- Don Adolfo Ruspoli, 2nd Duke of Alcudia (1822–1914), Grandee of Spain First Class
- Don Luigi Ruspoli, 3rd Marquis of Boadilla del Monte (1828–1893)
