= Schloss Frondsberg =

Castle in Austria

Coordinates: 47°18′47.45″N 15°41′23.68″E

- Styria, Austria
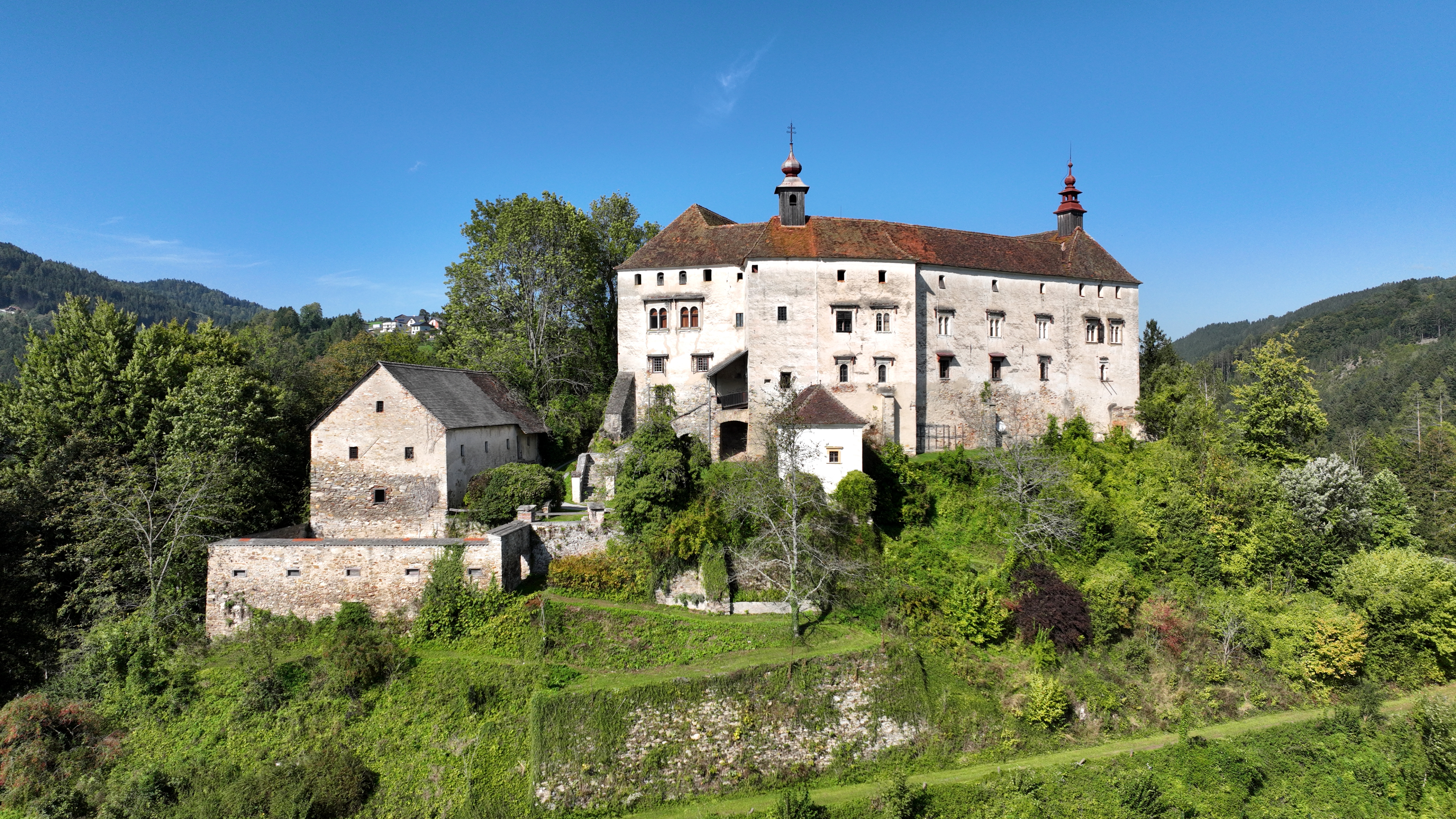

Site information
- Type: Castle

Schloss Frondsberg is a castle in Styria, Austria. Schloss Frondsberg is situated at an elevation of 593 m.

== See also ==
- List of castles in Austria
