= Johann, 1st Prince of Khevenhüller-Metsch =

Austrian statesman

His Serene Highness Johann Joseph, Prince of Khevenhüller-Metsch
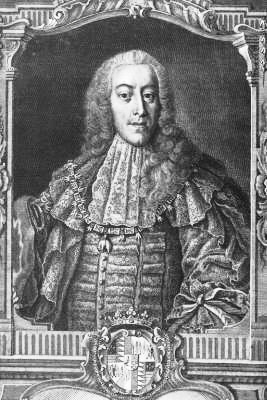

Habsburg Ambassador to Saxony
- In office 1740–1741
- Preceded by: Franz Karl von Wratislaw
- Succeeded by: C. de Launay

Bohemian Ambassador to the Holy Roman Empire
- In office 1737–1740
- Preceded by: Rudolph Joseph von Colloredo
- Succeeded by: Franz Philipp von Sternberg

Habsburg Ambassador to Denmark
- In office 1734–1737
- Preceded by: Johann von Harding (as Charge d'Affaires)
- Succeeded by: Johann von Harding (as Charge d'Affaires)

Personal details
- Born: 3 July 1706 Vienna, Archduchy of Austria
- Died: 18 April 1776 (aged 69) Vienna, Archduchy of Austria
- Spouse: Countess Karolina von Metsch (m. 1728, died)
- Parent(s): Sigmund Friedrich von Khevenhüller; Ernestine Leopoldine von Orsini-Rosenberg

Johann Joseph, Prince of Khevenhüller-Metsch (3 July 1706 – 18 April 1776) was an Austrian statesman and held a high position at the imperial court. From 1764 he was the first prince from the House of Khevenhüller.

== Early life ==
Khevenhüller was born in Vienna on 3 July 1706. He was the eldest son and heir of Sigmund Friedrich von Khevenhüller and, his second wife, Ernestine Leopoldine von Orsini-Rosenberg.

He received his schooling from a private tutor. He completed humanistic and legal studies in Vienna, Leyden and Strasbourg, and entered the civil service in 1725 as a Lower Austrian regimental councillor after undertaking the "Grand Tour" of Europe.

== Career ==
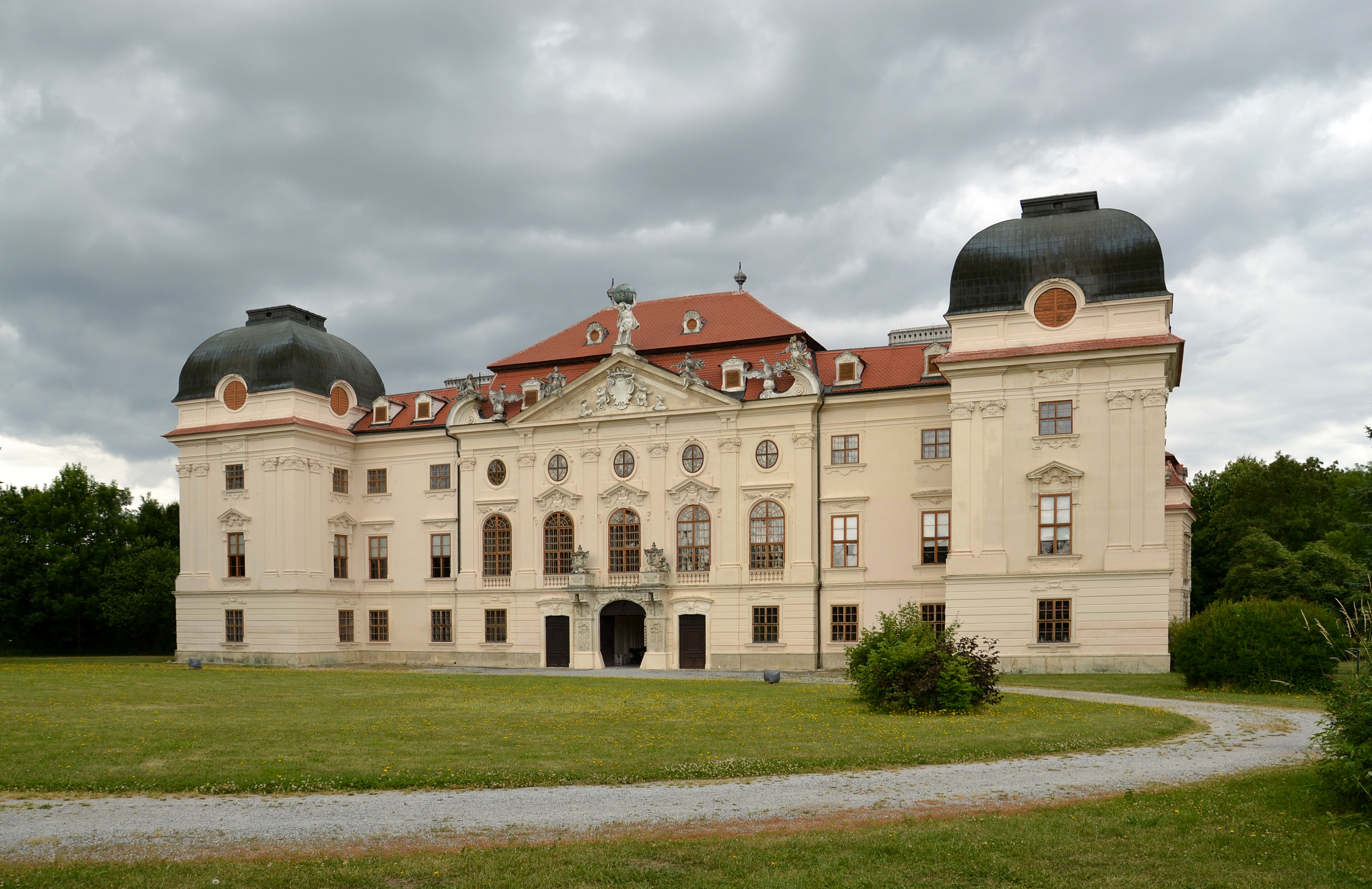
Riegersburg Castle, Hardegg

In 1727, he received the honorary title of Imperial Chamberlain. From 1728 he was an Imperial Court Councillor. Together with his father, he acquired Riegersburg Castle in Hardegg in 1730 and had it converted into a baroque castle by the architect Franz Anton Pilgram. In 1751, he set up a foundation at Riegersburg which financed a pastor for the church in neighbouring Felling. Between 1734 and 1737 he served as an ambassador in Munich, The Hague and Copenhagen. He returned in 1737 and supported his father, who was governor at the time.

In 1740, at the beginning of the reign of Empress Maria Theresa, he was Envoy Extraordinary in Dresden and Warsaw. There he tried to work to maintain peace. After his return to Vienna, he was given various court offices. From 1742 he was Imperial Lord Marshal. In 1745 he was Bohemia's envoy at the imperial election of Francis I in Frankfurt. In the same year, the emperor appointed him Lord Chamberlain. In 1765 he became second Lord Chamberlain and in 1770 first Lord Chamberlain . This was the highest court office. At the same time, he was State and Conference Minister. As such, he exercised considerable political influence.

The hereditary landmaster's office for Carinthia had been in the family since 1568. In 1751, Johann Joseph acquired Ladendorf Castle in Lower Austria. In 1775, he received the vacant office of chief hereditary landmaster of the Archduchy of Austria under the Enns for himself and his descendants.

In 1764, he and his heirs were elevated to the rank of Imperial Prince as majorat owners on the occasion of the coronation of Joseph II as Emperor. He had been a Knight of the Golden Fleece since 1744.

== Personal life ==
In 1728, Khevenhüller married Karolina Countess von Metsch, heiress of the Imperial Vice-Chancellor (German: Reichsvizekanzler) Count Johann Adolf von Metsch, who had died without male issue. Since 1751, he and his descendants called themselves Khevenhüller-Metsch. The couple had several children:

- Maria Josephine von Khevenhüller-Metsch (1729–1798), who married Count Karl Josef von Herberstein. After his death in 1753, she married Count Gábor Bethlen de Bethlen (1712–1768), Chancellor of Transylvania, in 1756.
- Johann Sigismund Friedrich von Khevenhüller-Metsch (1732–1801), who married Princess Maria Amalia of Liechtenstein, daughter of Prince Emanuel of Liechtenstein, in 1754. After her death in 1787, he married Countess Marie Josephine Strassoldo, a daughter of Count Vinzenz Strassoldo, in 1800.
- Johann Joseph Franz Quirin von Khevenhüller-Metsch (1733–1792), a Field Marshal-Lieutenant; he married Countess Maria Josepha von Schrattenbach in 1774.
- Maria Karolina Ernestina von Khevenhüller (1734–1746), who died young.
- Maria Aloysia Josepha von Khevenhüller (1735–1736), who died young.
- Johann Franz Xaver Anton von Khevenhüller-Metsch (1737–1797), Lord of Waxenegg; he married Countess Maria Theresia von Rottal.
- Johann Leopold Joseph von Khevenhüller (1739–1746), who died young.
- Maria Theresia von Khevenhüller-Metsch (1741–1805), who married Chancellor Count Leopold Wilhelm von Kolowrat-Krakowský, in 1769.
- Johann Ernst von Khevenhüller (1743–1743), who died young.
- Leopoldine von Khevenhüller-Metsch (d. c. 1781), who married Count Franz Příchovský von Příchovice in 1760.
- Maria Anna von Khevenhüller-Metsch (1746–1777), who married Count Karl Otto Vinzenz von Salm-Neuburg in 1770.
- Johann Emanuel Joseph von Khevenhüller-Metsch (1751–1847), who married Maria Giuseppina Mezzabarba.

Prince Johann died on 18 April 1776 in Vienna and was succeeded by his eldest son, Johann Sigismund Friedrich.

== Legacy ==
In 1894, Khevenhüllerstraße in Vienna-Währing (18th district) was named after him.

Diplomatic posts
Preceded by Johann von Harding (as Charge d'Affaires)	Habsburg Ambassador to Denmark; 1734–1737	Succeeded by Johann von Harding (as Charge d'Affaires)
Preceded by Rudolph Joseph von Colloredo	Bohemian Ambassador to the Holy Roman Empire; 1737–1740	Succeeded by Franz Philipp von Sternberg
Preceded by Franz Karl von Wratislaw	Habsburg Ambassador to Saxony; 1740–1741	Succeeded by C. de Launay
