= Melanie Metternich-Zichy =

Austrian aristocrat (1832-1919)

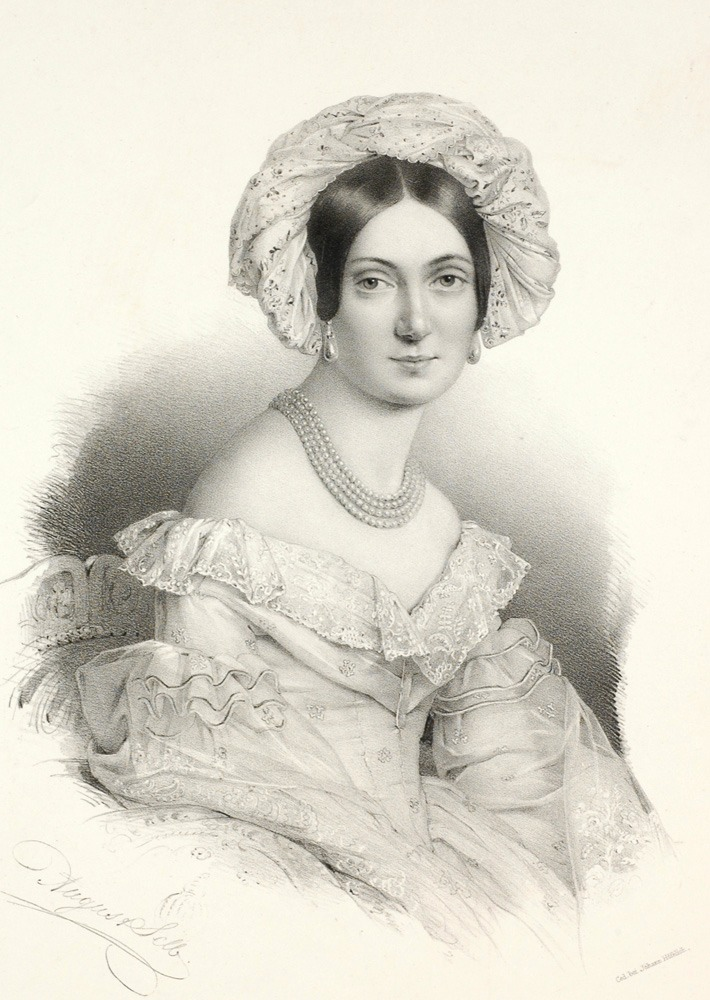
Melanie Metternich-Zichy; by August Selb (1812-1859)

Princess Melanie Marie Pauline Alexandrine von Metternich-Zichy (27 February 1832 in Vienna – 16 November 1919 in Vienna) was an Austrian aristocrat.

== Biography ==
A member of the House of Metternich, she was the daughter of Austrian diplomat and politician Prince Klemens von Metternich and his third wife, Countess Melanie Zichy-Ferraris (1805–1854).

She married Count József Zichy de Zich et Vásonkeő (1814–1897), brother of Antónia Zichy, on 20 November 1853.

Not a traditional conservative like her father, Princess Melanie Metternich-Zichy played a role in founding the Christian Social Party (Austria). For example, in 1888, her palace was the site of a meeting of politicians who would eventually found the Christian Social Party; that meeting was attended by, among others, Karl Lueger and Karl Freiherr von Vogelsang.

French journalist Dominique Paoli claimed to have found evidence that Maxime Weygand was the illegitimate offspring of Belgian general Alfred van der Smissen and Mélanie Zichy-Metternich, lady-in-waiting to Empress Carlota. Paoli further claimed that Weygand had been born in mid-1865, not January 1867 as is generally claimed.

== Ancestry ==
Ancestors of Melanie Metternich-Zichy

8. Johann Hugo, Count of Metternich-Winneburg
4. Franz Georg Karl, Count of Metternich-Winneburg
9. Baroness Clara Luise von Kesselstatt
2. Klemens, Prince of Metternich-Winneburg zu Beilstein
10. Baron Johann Friedrich Fridolin von Kageneck
5. Countess Maria Beatrix von Kageneck
11. Baroness Maria Anna Franziska Eleonore von Andlau
1. Princess Melanie von Metternich-Zichy
12. Count Karl von Zichy-Vásonykeö
6. Count Ferenc Franz Zichy de Zich et Vásonkeö
13. Countess Anna Antonia von Khevenhüller-Metsch
3. Countess Melanie Zichy-Ferraris
14. Count Joseph Jean François de Ferraris
7. Countess Marie Wilhelmine von Ferraris
15. Marie Henriëtte Christine Leonarde d'Ursel
