= Zichy =

Zichy is a surname. Notable people with the name include:

- Mihály Zichy (1827–1906), Hungarian painter and graphic artist
- Maria Anna Stubenberg Zichy (1821–1912), composer
- Eleonóra Zichy (1867–1945), Hungarian noblewoman
- Géza Zichy (1849–1924), Hungarian composer
- Melanie Metternich-Zichy (1832–1919), Austrian aristocrat
- Theodore Zichy (1908–1987), British-Hungarian auto racer, actor, photographer, film director, producer and playboy

== See also ==
- Zichy family, is the name of a Magyar family of the Hungarian nobility
- Zichy Land, is a geographical subgroup of Franz Josef Land, Arkhangelsk Oblast, Russia
