= Wernberg =

Wernberg Vernberk
- Municipality
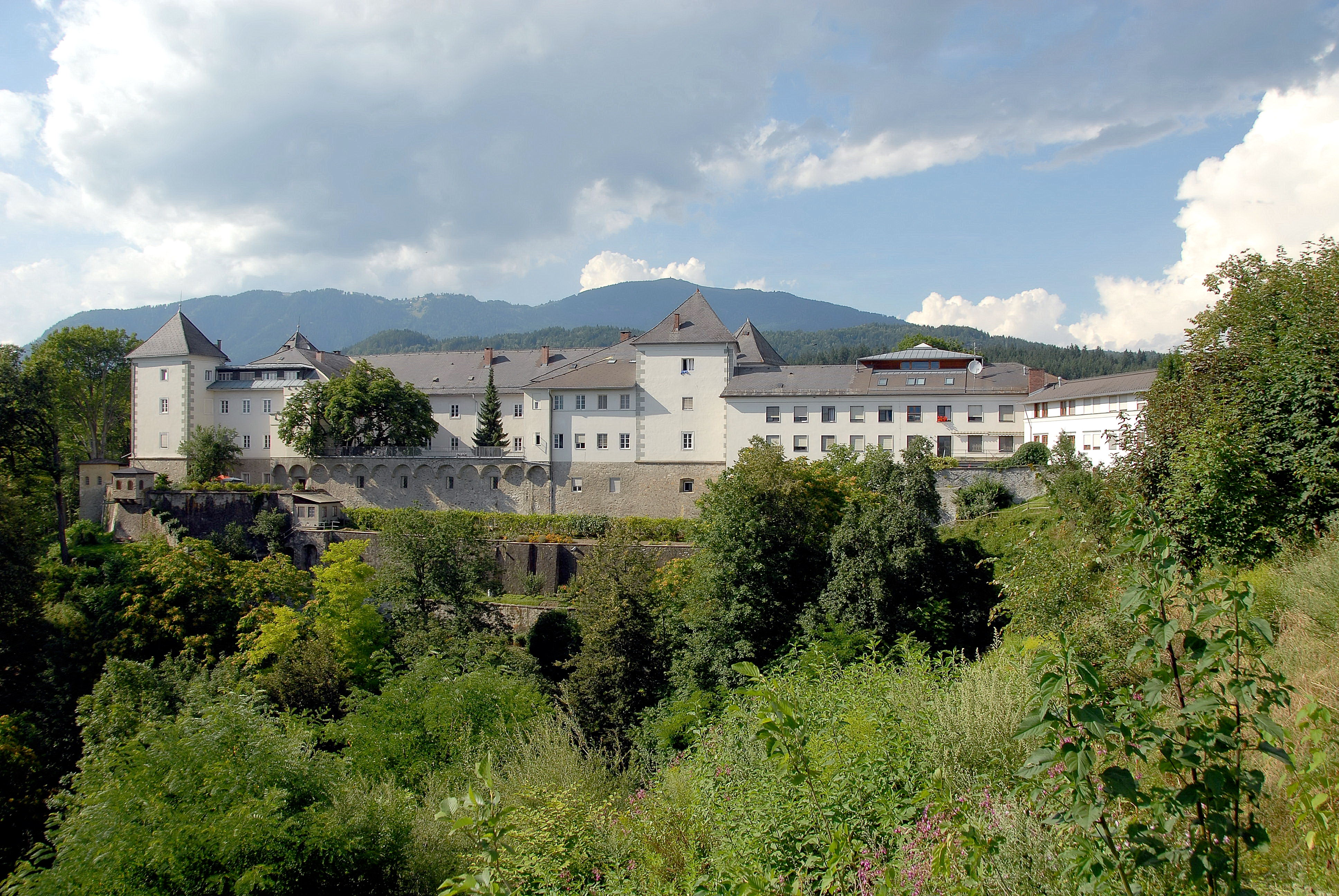
- Wernberg Castle

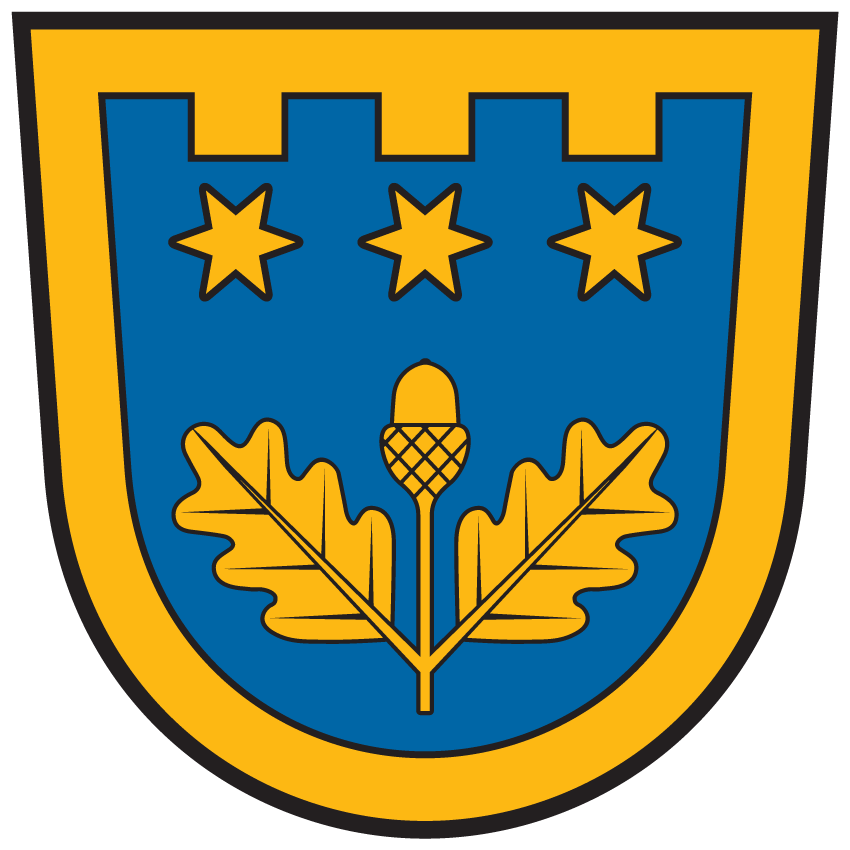
- Coat of arms

- Location within Austria
- Coordinates: 46°37′N 13°56′E
- Country: Austria
- State: Carinthia
- District: Villach-Land

Government
  - Mayor: Doris Liposchek (SPÖ)

Area
  - Total: 26.42 km^{2} (10.20 sq mi)
- Elevation: 590 m (1,940 ft)

Population (2016-01-01)
  - Total: 5,587
  - Density: 211.5/km^{2} (547.7/sq mi)
- Time zone: UTC+1 (CET)
  - Summer (DST): UTC+2 (CEST)
- Postal code: 9241
- Area code: 04252
- Website: www.wernberg.gv.at

Wernberg (Slovene: Vernberk) is a municipality in the district of Villach-Land in the Austrian state of Carinthia.

== Geography ==
Wernberg lies on the Drava River at the foot of the Ossiach Tauern range, east of Villach, and between Lake Ossiach on the north, Wörthersee on the east, and Lake Faak in the southern part of the municipality. It is located at the northwestern rim of the traditional settlement area of Carinthian Slovenes.

The municipal area comprises the cadastral communities of Neudorf (Nova vas), Sand (Pešče), Trabenig (Trabenče), Umberg (Umbar), and Wernberg (Vernberk).

=== Neighboring municipalities ===
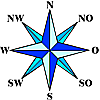
	Ossiach
Villach		Velden
	Villach

== History ==
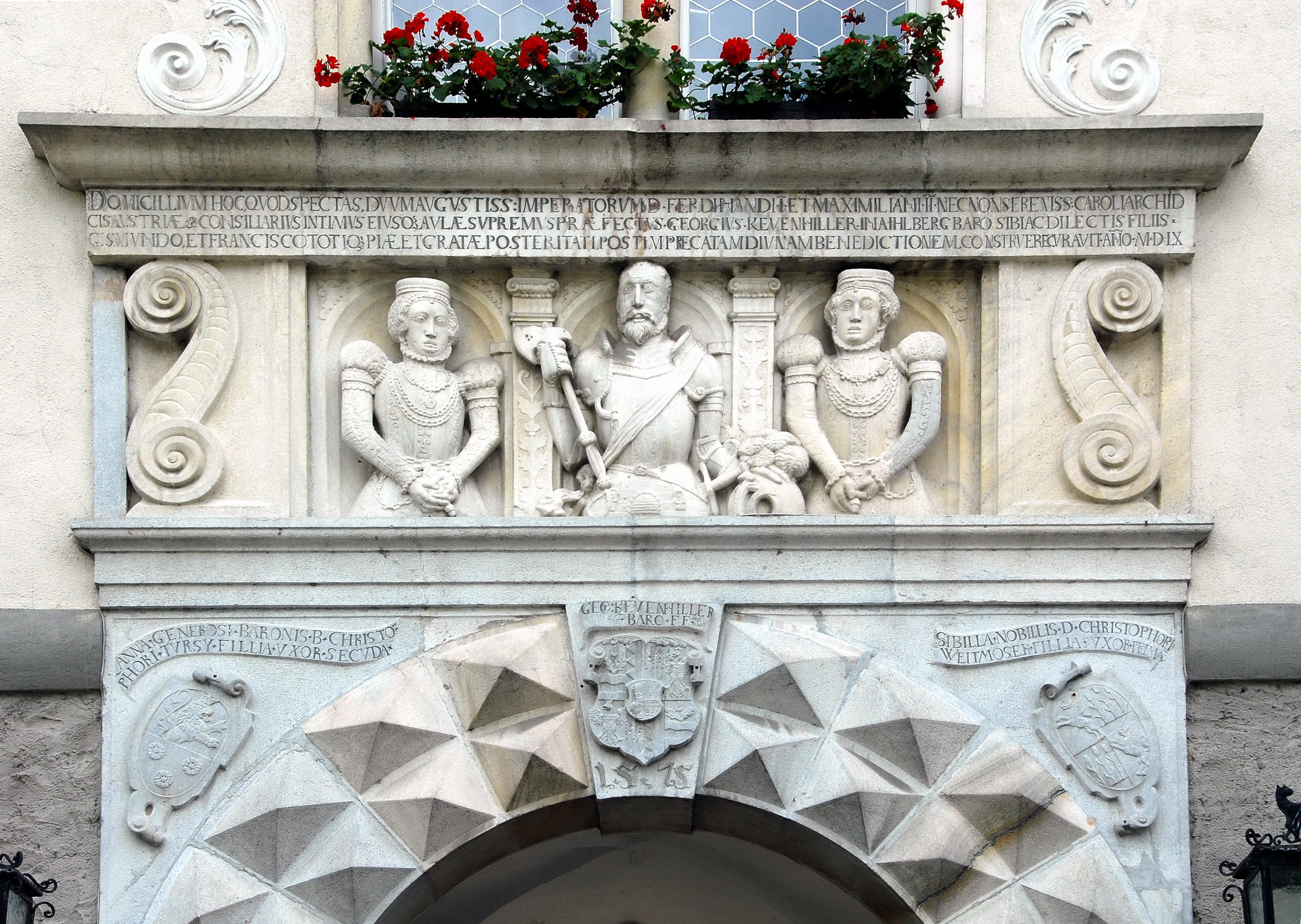
Wernberg Castle, relief of George Khevenhüller and his wives, 1575

Archaeological findings indicate an early settlement of the area already in Roman times. A castle near the village of Sternberg, today a ruin, was first mentioned in a deed issued at Saint Paul's Abbey about 1170/80. Wernberg itself first appeared in a document dated 17 November 1227 determining the demolition of a Drava bridge and the transfer of Werdenberch Castle to the Carinthian estates of the Bishopric of Bamberg.

The castle, situated on a rock above the Drava river, was built under the rule of Duke Bernhard of Carinthia, it later passed to the Austrian Habsburgs. Held by the Khevenhüller noble family from 1519 onwards, the present-day Renaissance building was erected at the behest of the Carinthian governor George Khevenhüller (1533–1587). Part of the Ossiach Abbey estates from 1672, it is since 1935 a possession of the Catholic Missionary Sisters of the Precious Blood.

The municipality of Wernberg was established in 1850.

== Politics ==
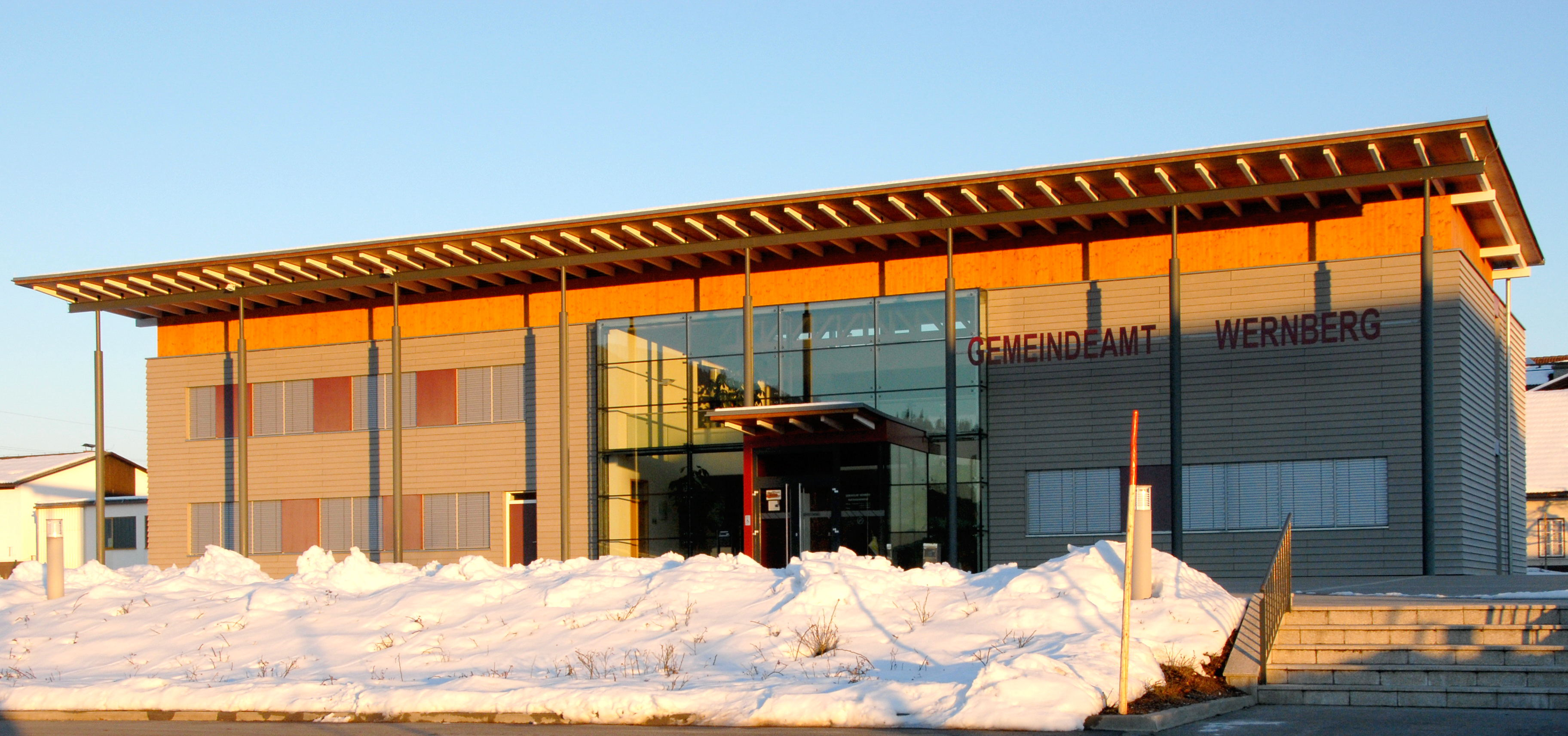
Town hall

The municipal council (Gemeinderat) consists of 23 members. Since the 2021 local elections, it is made up of the following parties:

- Social Democratic Party of Austria (SPÖ): 14 seats
- Austrian People's Party (ÖVP): 4 seats
- Freedom Party of Austria (FPÖ): 4 seats
- The Greens - The Green Alternative (GRÜNE): 1 seat

The mayor, Doris Liposchek (SPÖ), was elected in 2021.
