= Karl Alois, Prince Lichnowsky =

Czech aristocrat and arts patron (1761-1814)

Karl Alois
- Prince Lichnowsky of Woschütz
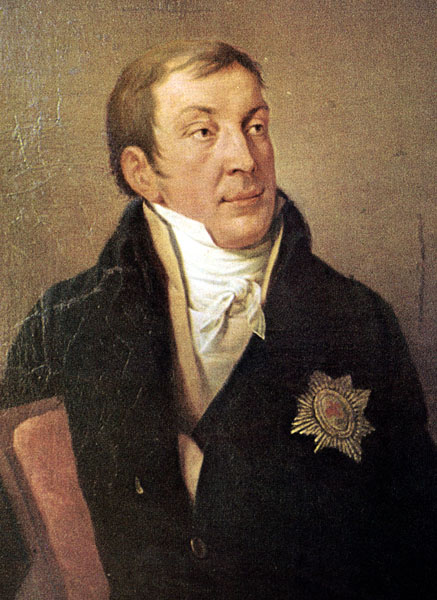
- Karl Alois, Prince Lichnowsky in 1800; artist unknown
- Known for: Patron of Ludwig van Beethoven
- Born: June 21, 1761; Vienna, Archduchy of Austria
- Died: April 15, 1814 (aged 52)
- Spouse: Countess Maria Christiane von Thun und Hohenstein (m. 1788)
- Occupation: Prince, Chamberlain

Karl Alois, Prince Lichnowsky of Woschütz (German: Karl Alois Johann-Nepomuk Vinzenz Leonhard, Fürst Lichnowsky von Woschütz, also known as Carl Alois, Fürst von Lichnowsky-Woschütz; 21 June 1761 – 15 April 1814) was the second Prince Lichnowsky and a chamberlain at the Imperial Austrian court. He is remembered for his patronage of music and his relationships with Wolfgang Amadeus Mozart and Ludwig van Beethoven.

== Life ==
Karl Alois, Prince Lichnowsky was born in Vienna in 1761. Karl Alois was born as the eldest son of Prince Friedrich Karl Johann Amadeus von Lichnowsky-Werdenberg (1720-1788) and his wife, Countess Maria Karolina von Althann (1741-1800). Although Lichnowsky spent most of his time in Vienna, it was actually in Prussia that he held the title of Prince. His estates were located in Grätz, in the Austrian part of the historic province of Silesia, most of which was conquered by Prussia earlier in the century. The location is today called Hradec nad Moravicí and is within the borders of the Czech Republic.

In his youth (1776 to 1782) he was a law student, studying in Leipzig and in Göttingen. While in Göttingen he met Johann Nikolaus Forkel, who later was to become famous for writing the first biography of J. S. Bach. Lichnowsky at the time began to collect works by Bach in manuscript copies. He also was a musician and a composer. Karl Alois was a Mason and a lodge brother of Mozart; see Mozart and Freemasonry.

== Private life ==
Lichnowsky was married (1788) to Countess Maria Christiane von Thun und Hohenstein (1765-1841), the "beautiful" (according to Otto Erich Deutsch) daughter of Count Franz Josef Anton von Thun und Hohenstein (1734-1801), an Imperial Chamberlain and his wife, Countess Maria Wilhelmine von Thun und Hohenstein, née Countess von Uhlfeldt (1744-1800).

== Relationship with Mozart ==
In 1789 he traveled to Berlin, taking Mozart along with him. For details of the trip, see Mozart's Berlin journey.

He also lent Mozart money, which Mozart was unable to repay. This led the Prince to sue Mozart, and on 9 November 1791, a few weeks before Mozart died, the Lower Austria Court (Landrechte) decided the case in favor of the Prince, ruling that Mozart owed him the sum of 1,435 florins and 32 kreutzer, a substantial amount. The court issued an order to the chamber of the Imperial court (Mozart's employer) to attach half of Mozart's salary of 800 florins per year. The evidence of the lawsuit was uncovered (by Otto Mraz) only in 1991, and hence is not discussed in earlier Mozart biographies.

== Relationship with Beethoven ==
Lichnowsky was one of the most significant aristocratic supporters of Beethoven. In an 1805 letter the composer called him "one of my most loyal friends and promoters of my art."

In 1796, the Prince traveled to Prague, this time taking Beethoven with him. The composer was on his way to Berlin.

In 1800, Lichnowsky gave Beethoven an annual allowance of 600 florins until such time as he found a regular appointment as a musician. The stipend continued until 1806, when a furious quarrel erupted between the two, terminating their friendship: Beethoven, staying at Lichnowsky's country estate, had refused to play for visiting French officers. Later, arriving home in Vienna, Beethoven smashed a bust of the Prince.

Seven of Beethoven's musical compositions, all before 1806, were dedicated to Lichnowsky:

- The three piano trios, Opus 1 (1795)
- The "Nine variations for piano on 'Quant'è più bello' from Giovanni Paisiello's opera La Molinara", for piano solo, WoO 69 (1795)
- The Piano sonata in C minor, Opus 13, "Pathétique" (1798)
- The Piano sonata in A-flat major, Opus 26 (1801)
- The Second Symphony in D major, Opus 36 (1802)

== Death ==
He died of a stroke in Vienna on 15 April 1814.

== Sources ==
- Clive, Peter (2001) Beethoven and his World: A Biographical Dictionary. Oxford University Press.
- Deutsch, Otto Erich (1965) Mozart: A Documentary Biography. Stanford, CA: Stanford University Press.
- Grove Dictionary of Music and Musicians, article "Lichnowsky". Online edition. Copyright 2007 by Oxford University Press. The article is by Elliott Forbes and William Meredith.
- Nosow, Robert (1997) "Beethoven's popular keyboard publications," Music and Letters 56-76.
- Solomon, Maynard (1995) Mozart: A Life. New York: Harper Collins.
