= Lichnowsky =

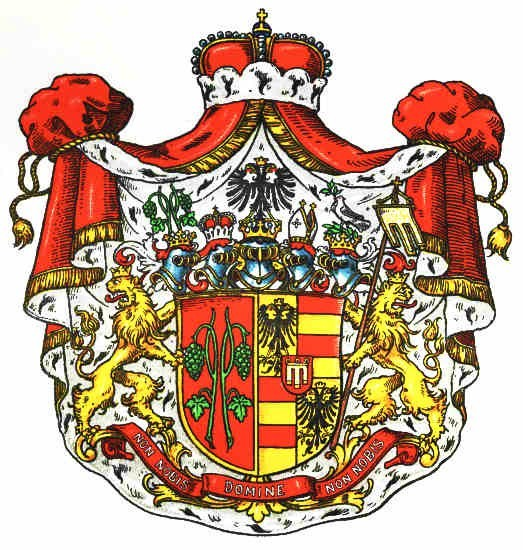
Coat of arms of Prince Lichnowsky, Count of Werdenberg

The House of Lichnowsky or House of Lichnovský is the name of an influential Czech aristocratic family of Silesian and Moravian origin, documented since the 14th century.

== History ==
The noble family first appeared in the Duchy of Pless (Pszczyna) in Upper Silesia, when one Estepan de Woszyczyki, probably from Woszczyce (German: Woschtitz) near Orzesze, on 17 March 1377 obtained the office of a Schultheiß reeve in Lędziny from the Přemyslid duke John of Opava. His descendant Hanuš (John) of Woszczyki, judge in the Upper Silesian Duchy of Krnov from 1498 to 1507, by marriage acquired the estates of Lichnov in Moravia. He is first mentioned with his surname Lichnovský in a 1494 deed.

== Ennoblements ==
- Franz Bernhard Lichnowsky (1664–1747): Bohemian Freiherr (Baron) with the nobiliary particle of an Edler von Woschtitz in 1702
- Karl Franz Leopold Bernhard Lichnowsky (1690–1742), son: Bohemian Graf (Count) on 1 January 1721, Imperial Count on 27 May 1727
- Geheimrat Friedrich Carl Johann Amadeus Lichnowsky (1720–1788), son: Fürst (Prince) in Prussia on 30 January 1773; the princely title was not recognised in Austria until 30 December 1846

The head of the family was an hereditary member of the Prussian House of Lords from 12 October 1854 and was granted the title of Durchlaucht (Serene Highness) in Prussia on 8 March 1860.

== Notable members ==
- Karl Alois, Prince Lichnowsky (1761–1814), patron of Wolfgang Amadeus Mozart and Ludwig van Beethoven
- Moritz Lichnowsky (1771–1837), younger brother of Karl Alois and a faithful friend of Ludwig van Beethoven
- Eduard Lichnowsky (1789–1845), writer
- Felix, Prince Lichnowsky (5 April 1814 – 18 September 1848), politician
- Karl Max, Prince Lichnowsky (8 March 1860 – 27 February 1928), German ambassador in London
- Mechtilde Lichnowsky (1879–1958), his wife
- Margarethe von Lichnowsky (1863–1954), wife of Count Karol Lanckoroński
