= Ruegers Castle =

Castle in Austria

Coordinates: 48.8543°N 15.7717°E

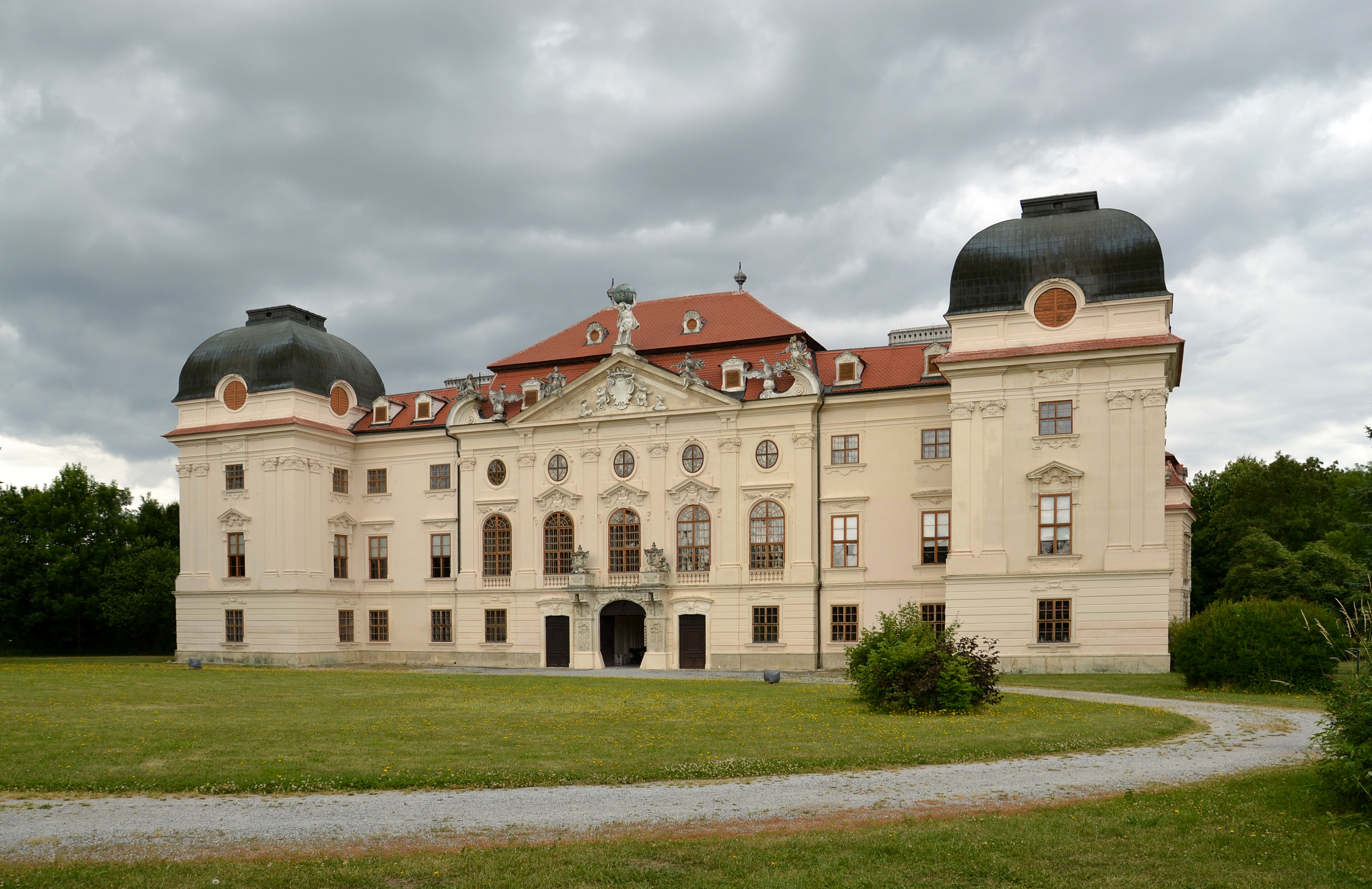
Front view

Ruegers Castle (also called Riegersburg Castle until 2017) is a Baroque castle in Riegersburg near Hardegg in Austria, near the border with the Czech Republic.

== History ==
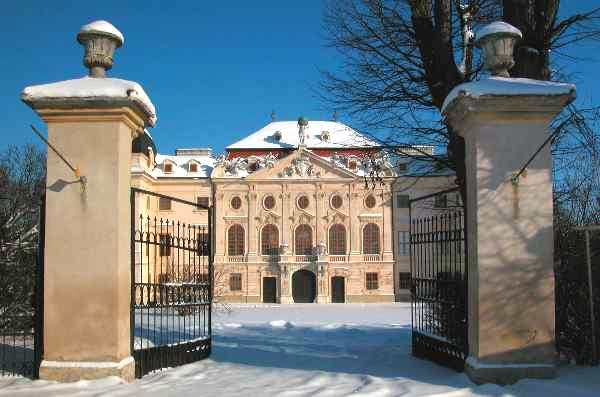
Riegersburg Castle

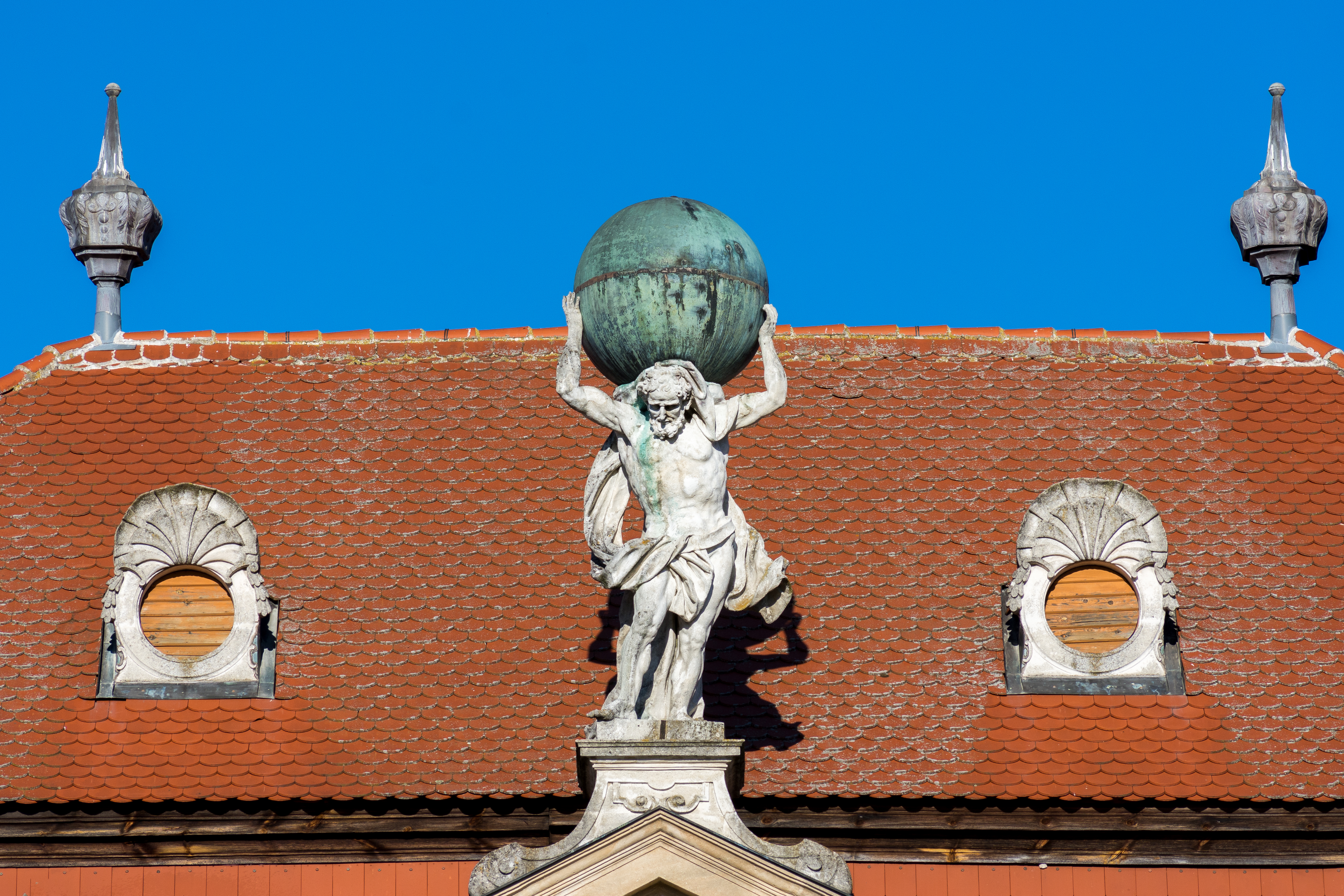
Atlas statue as gable decoration

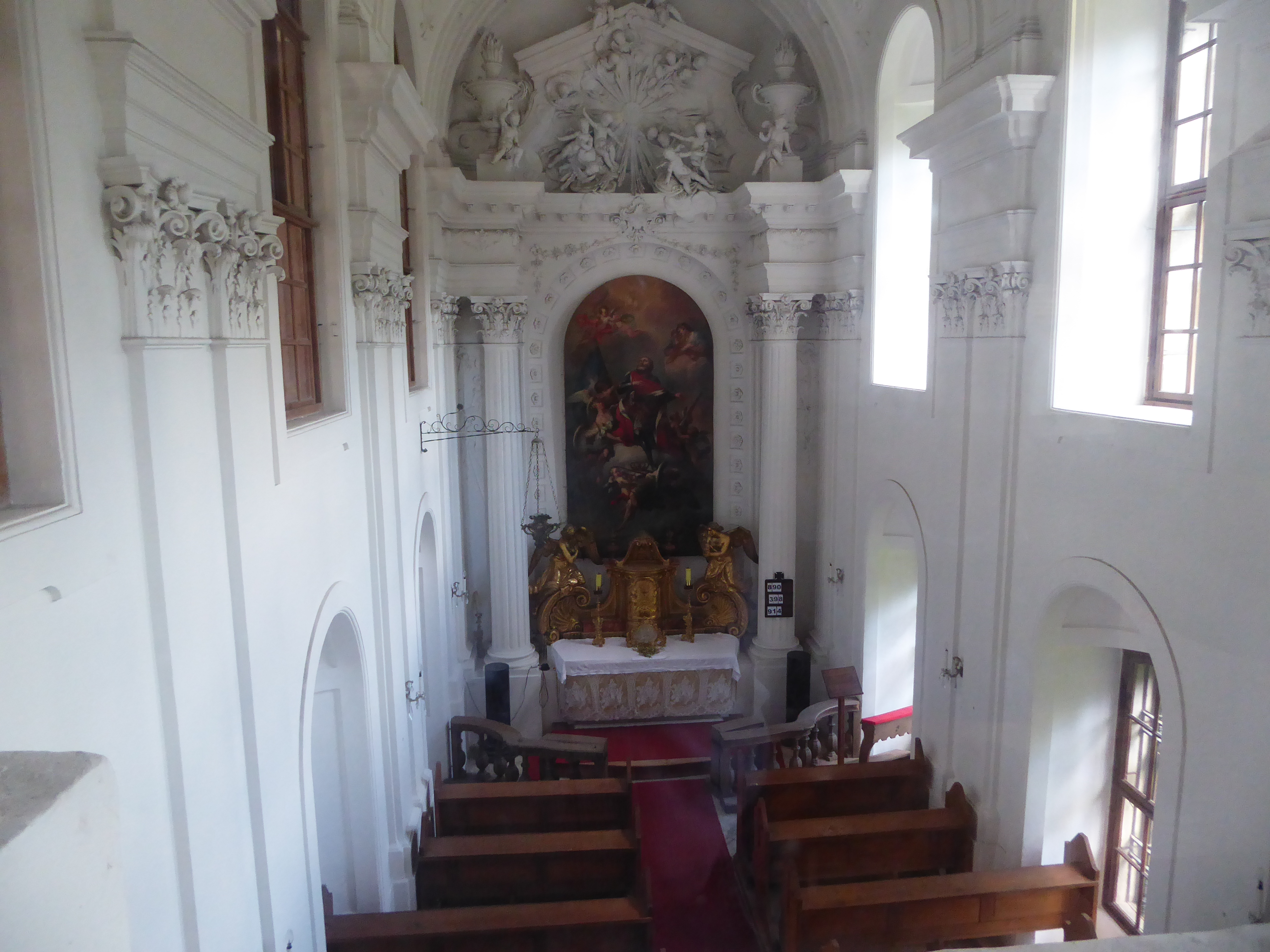
Chapel at the castle

There are varying reports regarding the first mention of Riegersburg in the border area of Weinviertel and Waldviertel in Lower Austria: The oldest mention comes from the year 1212 (property of the Counts Hardegg or their followers), another source gives the year 1390 (a castle called Ruegers is mentioned).

=== 16th/17th century ===
In 1568, Sigmund, Count of Hardegg, acquired the castle from the Eyczingers, who had owned it since 1441. He had a moated castle built in place of the dilapidated castle and set up his administrative headquarters for the Counts of Hardegg here, as well as his residence. After taking over, his son Johann Wilhelm von Hardegg set about buying up indebted estates and thereby got himself into a serious financial crisis. After his death in 1635, his estate was declared bankrupt. His heir, Julius von Hardegg, took over the debts and, in order to pay them back, sold the Counties of Riegersburg and Hardegg in 1656.

=== 18th century ===
The buyers were the Counts of Saint Julien-Wallsee, who in turn sold the County of Hardegg as well as the lordships of Riegersburg, Prutzendorf and Obermixnitz and Untermixnitz, including all their belongings, on 1 August 1730 to Sigmund Friedrich von Khevenhüller, who had been elevated to Imperial Count in 1725.

A few days later, the buyer set off for Riegersburg with his son Johann Joseph von Khevenhüller-Metsch, who had co-signed the purchase contract, where he found a dilapidated and most likely uninhabitable building. The castle in its current form was built in several phases between 1730 and 1780 according to plans by Franz Anton Pilgram, a student of Johann Lucas von Hildebrandt.

The chapel in the north wing of the castle was consecrated in 1755.

=== 20th century ===
In 1945, some displaced persons from neighboring South Moravia were housed in the castle, then the Soviet occupying forces moved in. After their departure in 1955, not much of the original furnishings remained. They only left a newly installed stove in the master kitchen, which is still in working order today.

The castle was partially renovated for the Lower Austrian State Exhibition in 1993 under the motto "Family – Ideal and Reality".

=== 21st century ===
The castle and its property, including Hardegg Castle, belonged by inheritance to the Counts Pilati von Thassul zu Daxberg. In 2021, the castle was acquired by the artist Gottfried Helnwein and the real estate entrepreneur Klemens Hallmann.

== See also ==
- List of castles in Austria
