= Vranov nad Dyjí =

- Market town
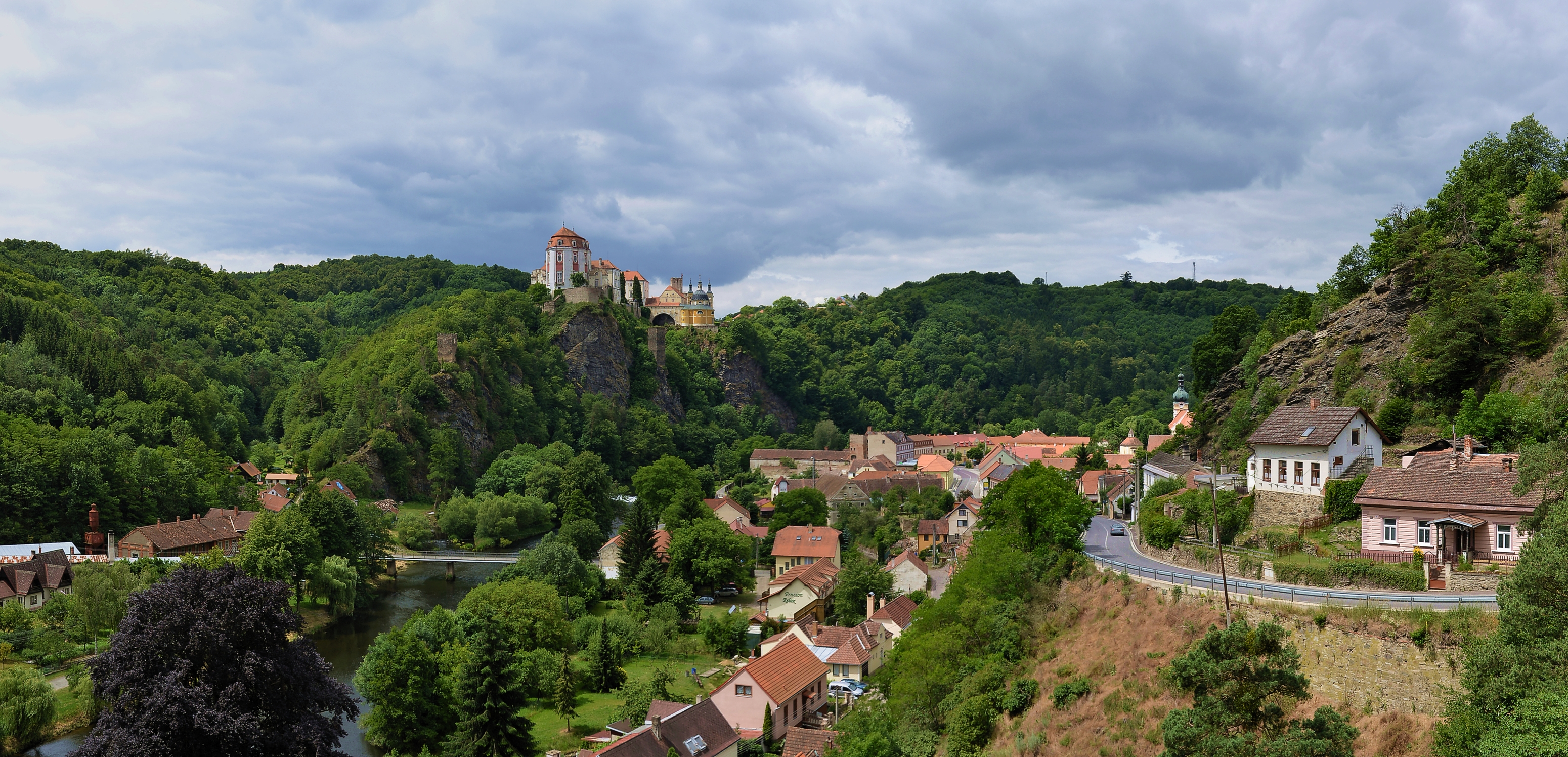
- Panorama of the market town

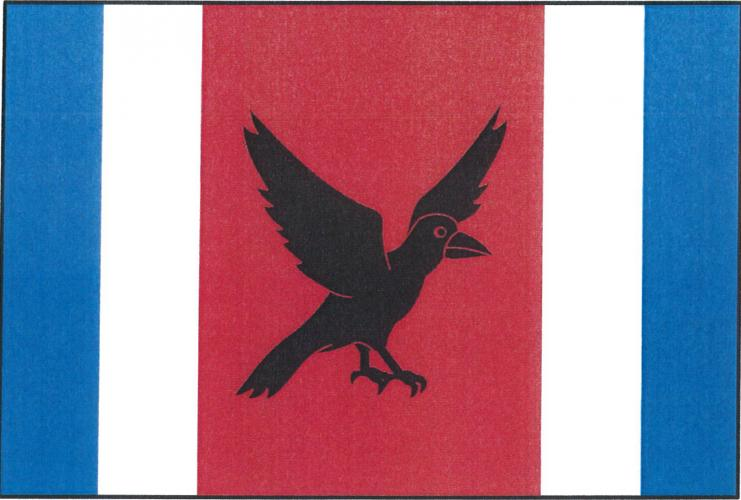
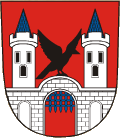
- Flag Coat of arms

- Location in the Czech Republic
- Coordinates: 48°53′41″N 15°48′46″E
- Country: Czech Republic
- Region: South Moravian
- District: Znojmo
- First mentioned: 1100

Area
  - Total: 13.47 km^{2} (5.20 sq mi)
- Elevation: 312 m (1,024 ft)

Population (2026-01-01)
  - Total: 777
  - Density: 57.7/km^{2} (149/sq mi)
- Time zone: UTC+1 (CET)
  - Summer (DST): UTC+2 (CEST)
- Postal code: 671 03
- Website: www.ouvranov.cz

Vranov nad Dyjí (Czech pronunciation: [ˈvranof ˈnad dɪjiː]; until 1986 Vranov; German: Frain) is a market town in Znojmo District in the South Moravian Region of the Czech Republic. It has about 800 inhabitants. The market town is located on the Thaya River.

Vranov nad Dyjí is known as a summer resort. The main landmarks of the market town are the Vranov nad Dyjí Castle and Nový Hrádek Castle, which are protected together as a national cultural monument.

== Geography ==
Vranov nad Dyjí is located about 18 kilometres (11 mi) west of Znojmo and 65 km (40 mi) southwest of Brno, on the border with Austria. It borders the municipal territory of Hardegg. It lies in the Jevišovice Uplands. The highest point is the mountain Býčí hora at 536 m (1,759 ft) above sea level.

Vranov nad Dyjí lies in the valley of the Thaya River. A part of the Vranov Reservoir, which is named after the market town, is situated in the northern part of the municipal territory. The Podyjí National Park occupies the southern part of the territory.

== History ==
The first written mention of Vranov is from 1100, when the Vranov nad Dyjí Castle was mentioned in Chronica Boemorum. In 1323, the estate was acquired by the Lords of Lipá. The Lichtenburg noble family took control of Vranov during the 15th century. From 1516 to 1629, the estate often changed owners.

During the Thirty Years' War, the castle was besieged and damaged by Swedish troops, and the destruction was completed by a large fire in 1665. The Althann family, who acquired the castle in 1680, reconstructed the old Gothic structure into a representative Baroque residence. In the 19th century, the extensive landscape park was added.

Between 1790 and 1882, Vranov was known for its manufactory of earthenware. After 1816, the manufactory began producing ceramic of the wedgwood type.

== Demographics ==
Historical population

Year	Pop.	±%
1869	1,066	—
1880	1,071	+0.5%
1890	1,052	−1.8%
1900	1,061	+0.9%
1910	1,048	−1.2%

Year	Pop.	±%
1921	1,146	+9.4%
1930	1,676	+46.2%
1950	938	−44.0%
1961	1,063	+13.3%
1970	990	−6.9%

Year	Pop.	±%
1980	976	−1.4%
1991	931	−4.6%
2001	919	−1.3%
2011	819	−10.9%
2021	738	−9.9%

Source: Censuses

== Transport ==
There are no railways or major roads passing through the municipality.

== Sights ==
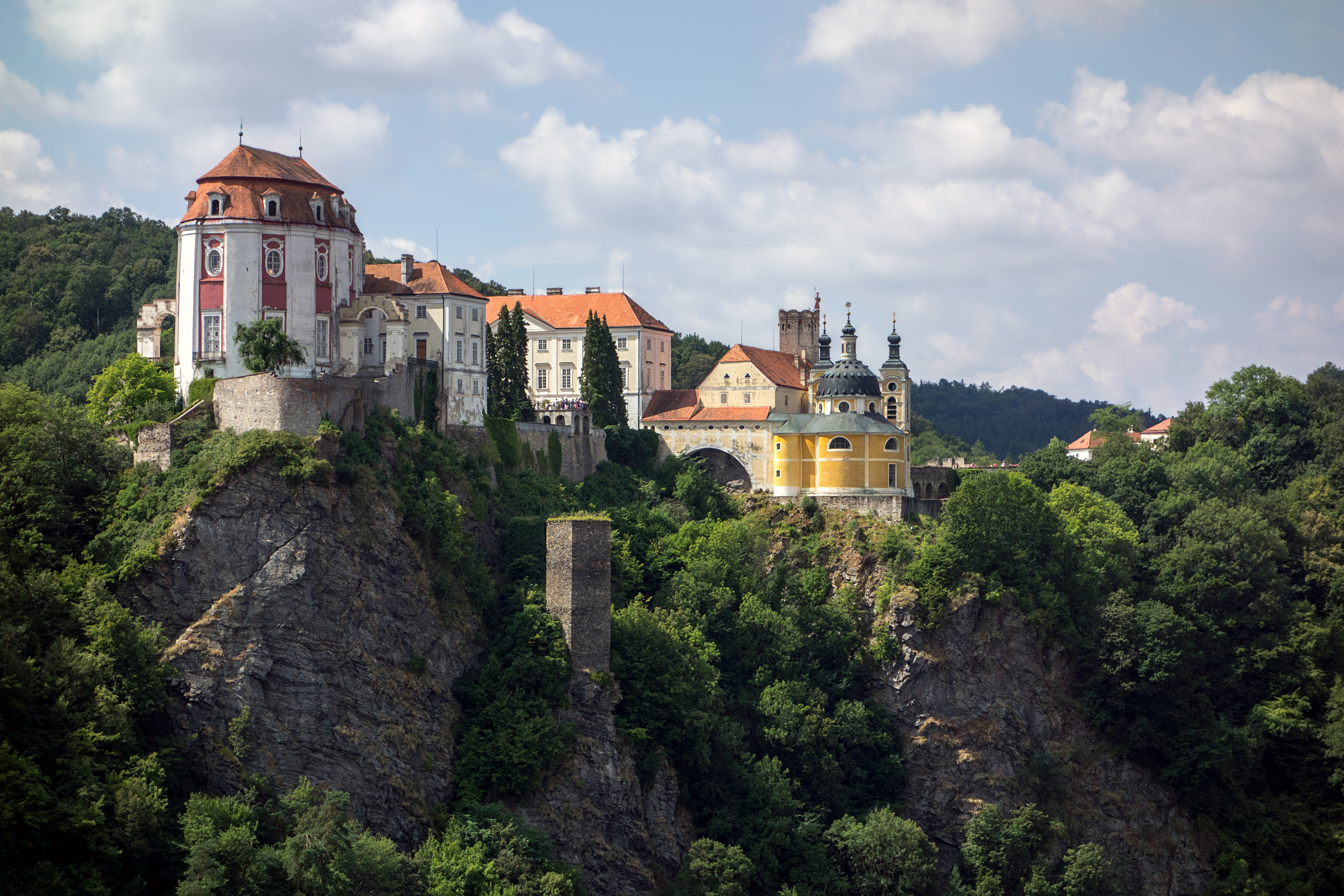
Vranov nad Dyjí Castle

Vranov nad Dyjí is known for the Vranov nad Dyjí Castle. Today the castle is owned by the state and is open to the public. Together with the ruins of Nový Hrádek Castle, Vranov nad Dyjí Castle is protected as a national cultural monument.
