= Thayatal National Park =

National park in Austria

Coordinates: 48.844°N 15.877°E

- IUCN category II (national park)
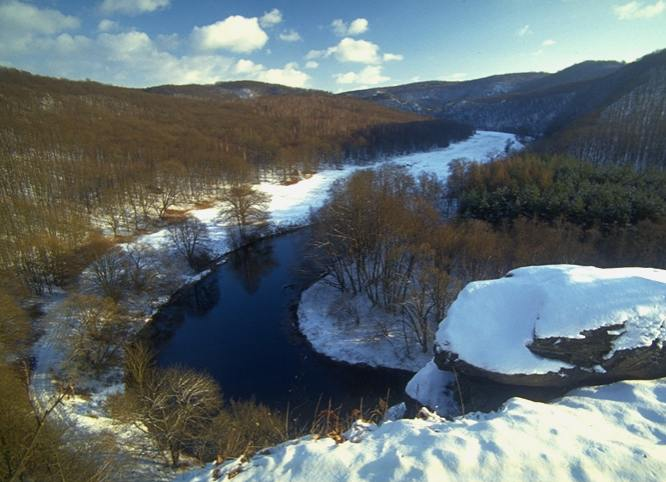
- Thaya River in the national park
- Interactive map of Thayatal National Park
- Location: Lower Austria
- Nearest city: Retz
- Area: 13.3 km^{2} (5.1 sq mi)
- Established: 2000

Ramsar Wetland
- Official name: Transboundary Ramsar Site Podyjí – Thayatal National Park, Part Austria
- Designated: 6 May 2025
- Reference no.: 2590

Thayatal National Park (German: Nationalpark Thayatal) is a 13.3 km^{2} Austrian national park located in the Lower Austrian border area with the Czech Republic. It connects to the Czech Podyjí National Park. The Thayatal with its steep hillside forests is one of the most beautiful breakthrough valleys in Austria. The highest point is the gneiss mountain around which the Thaya flows. It was founded in 2000.

The basis for the national park is the Lower Austrian National Park Act. It was agreed between the republic and the federal state back in 1997. It is largely based on the international criteria for national parks published by the IUCN, the International Union for Conservation of Nature. The Thayatal is referred to as a Category II area. When it was founded, it was planned to enlarge it to 1.7 km^{2}.

250 ha of the core zone of the national park belong to the WILDForest areas certified by the European Wilderness Society; 2 km of the Thaya is also certified as a WILDRiver. The park has been designated as a protected Ramsar site since 2026.

== Location ==
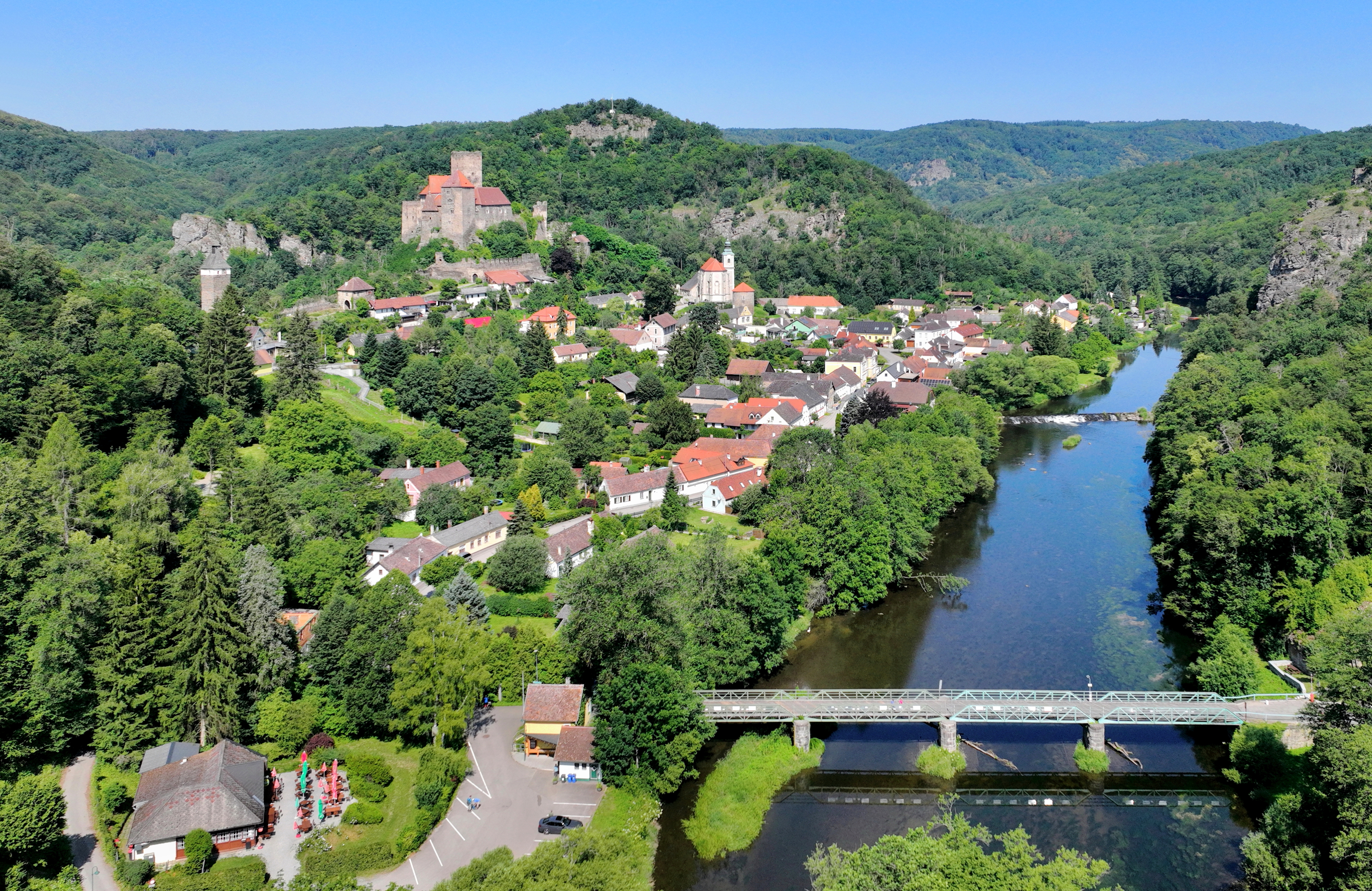
The town of Hardegg with the Hardegg Castle and the river Thaya

In addition to the town of Hardegg, Burg Hardegg and the Kaja ruins are located in the national park. In Hardegg, visitors can walk directly from the Austrian part over the Thaya bridge, which forms the state border, into the Czech National Park or go by bike.

In addition to the orientation towards the sun, the shape of the valley and the chemical properties of the underground rock are also responsible for the ecological diversity.

== Creation ==
Although the national park is much older on the Czech side, efforts to place it under protection also go back a long way in Austria.

After it became known in 1984 that a power plant was to be built on the Czech side on the Thaya, citizens' initiatives and the city of Hardegg tried successfully to prevent this.

In 1988 and 1991 two areas along the Thaya were placed under nature protection by ordinance of the Lower Austrian state government. These two areas are the forerunners of today's national park.

After the national park was created in the Czech Republic in 1991, it was already decided in 1992 in Austria to match the protection status on its side of the border.

After the preparation of the various feasibility studies and the creation of the legal framework, the state contract between Ministers Bartenstein and Edlinger for the Republic and Governor Pröll for the state of Lower Austria was signed in 1997 to establish the national park.

== Flora ==
The smallest national park in Austria is home to half of all plant species found in the country. The reason is that the area lies on the climatic boundary between the rougher, more humid plateau climate of the Central European transitional climate in the Waldviertel and the continentally influenced Pannonian climate in the Weinviertel. In the western part and on the shady northern slopes, beech forest communities dominate, in which not only the red beech but also sycamore maple, yew and mountain elm can be seen. In the herb layer grow the Turkish union, daphne, wood sorrel, onion-tooth root, Single-flowered pearl grass, and as a specialty the white forest bird.

Especially in the eastern part of the area, oak and hornbeam forests can be found on the south-facing slopes, which are very dry and warm due to solar radiation. The larva of the stag beetle grows in the fallen trees. The rare steppe polecat migrates through the larger dry and warm oak forests of the Podyjí National Park.

== Fauna ==
Numerous rare animal and plant species were able to defend their habitat in the Thayatal: otters, dice snakes, crested newts and white-tailed eagles as winter guests benefit from the intact river ecosystem. Black stork, Aesculapian snake and white-backed woodpecker live hidden in the near-natural forest. The dry grassland and rocky sites are also an important habitat for endangered species such as the eastern green lizard, smooth snake, eagle owl and common raven. After opening the Iron Curtain, animal species that have already disappeared in Austria have been spotted in the Thayatal: the elk and the wildcat.
