= Horní Břečkov =

- Municipality
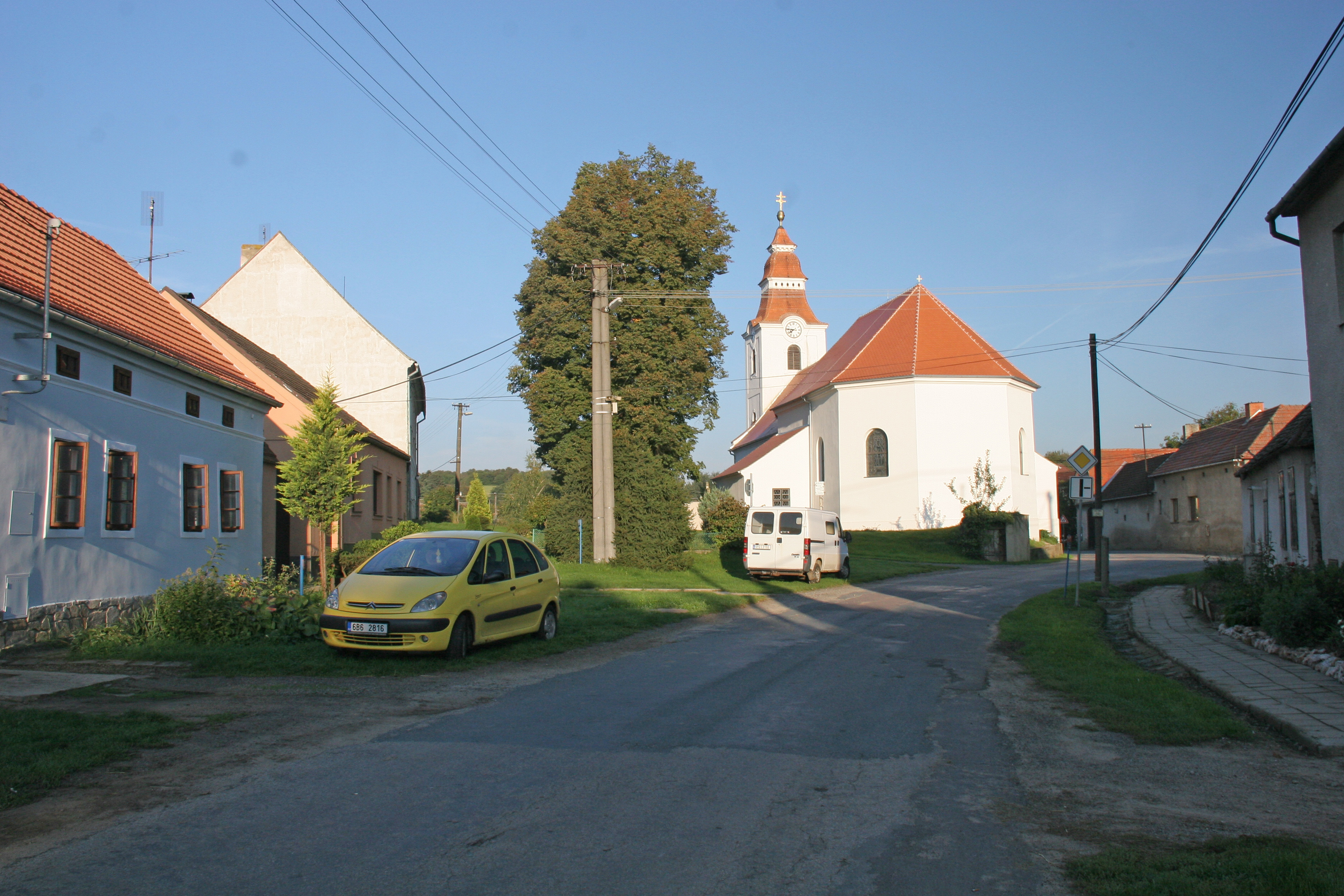
- Church of Saint Clemens

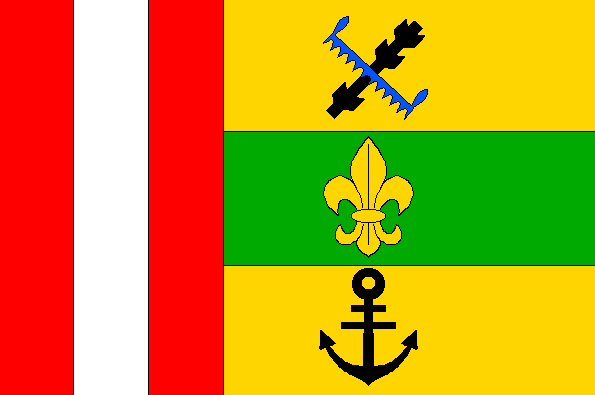
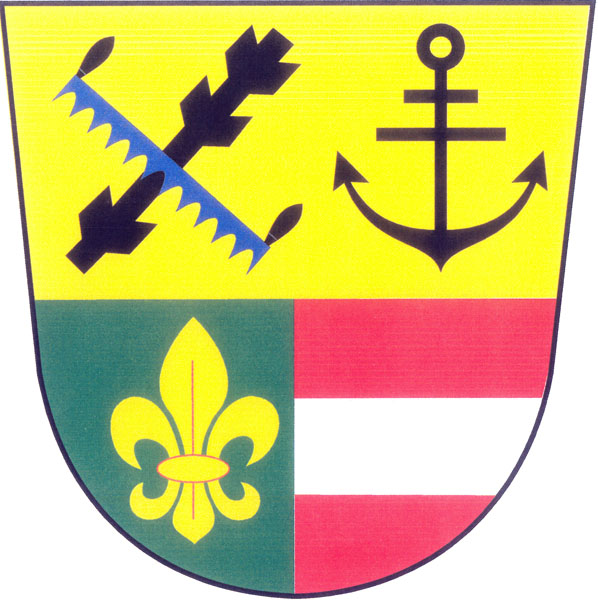
- Flag Coat of arms

- Location in the Czech Republic
- Coordinates: 48°53′24″N 15°53′54″E
- Country: Czech Republic
- Region: South Moravian
- District: Znojmo
- First mentioned: 1323

Area
  - Total: 21.09 km^{2} (8.14 sq mi)
- Elevation: 405 m (1,329 ft)

Population (2026-01-01)
  - Total: 265
  - Density: 12.6/km^{2} (32.5/sq mi)
- Time zone: UTC+1 (CET)
  - Summer (DST): UTC+2 (CEST)
- Postal code: 671 02
- Website: www.hornibreckov.cz

Horní Břečkov (German: Oberfröschau) is a municipality and village in Znojmo District in the South Moravian Region of the Czech Republic. It has about 300 inhabitants.

== Administrative division ==
Horní Břečkov consists of two municipal parts (in brackets population according to the 2021 census):

- Horní Břečkov (202)
- Čížov (50)

== Geography ==
Horní Břečkov is located about 11 km (7 mi) northwest of Znojmo and 61 km (38 mi) southwest of Brno. It borders Austria to the south and is adjacent to the Austrian town of Hardegg.

Horní Břečkov lies in the Jevišovice Uplands. The highest point is the hill Větrník at 510 m (1,670 ft) above sea level. The western and southern municipal border is formed by the Thaya River. Most of the territory lies in the Podyjí National Park.

== History ==
The first written mention of Horní Břečkov is in a deed of King John of Bohemia from 1323.

Allocated to newly established Czechoslovakia in 1919, Horní Břečkov was annexed by Nazi Germany upon the 1938 Munich Agreement and administered as part of the Reichsgau Niederdonau. After World War II, it was returned to Czechoslovakia and the German-speaking population was expelled.

== Demographics ==
Historical population

Year	Pop.	±%
1869	594	—
1880	572	−3.7%
1890	619	+8.2%
1900	557	−10.0%
1910	565	+1.4%

Year	Pop.	±%
1921	562	−0.5%
1930	607	+8.0%
1950	394	−35.1%
1961	372	−5.6%
1970	346	−7.0%

Year	Pop.	±%
1980	309	−10.7%
1991	276	−10.7%
2001	278	+0.7%
2011	275	−1.1%
2021	252	−8.4%

Source: Censuses

== Transport ==
There are no railways or major roads passing through the municipality.

== Sights ==
The main landmark of Horní Břečkov is the Church of Saint Clemens. A stone with carved year 1198 indicates that this is one of the oldest churches in the region. The church has a late Gothic core, but it was completely rebuilt in the Renaissance style in the 16th century and reconstructed in the Baroque style in 1748 and 1831.
