= Burgruine Waxenegg =

Castle ruin in Austria

Coordinates: 47°16′15″N 15°40′42″E

- Styria, Austria
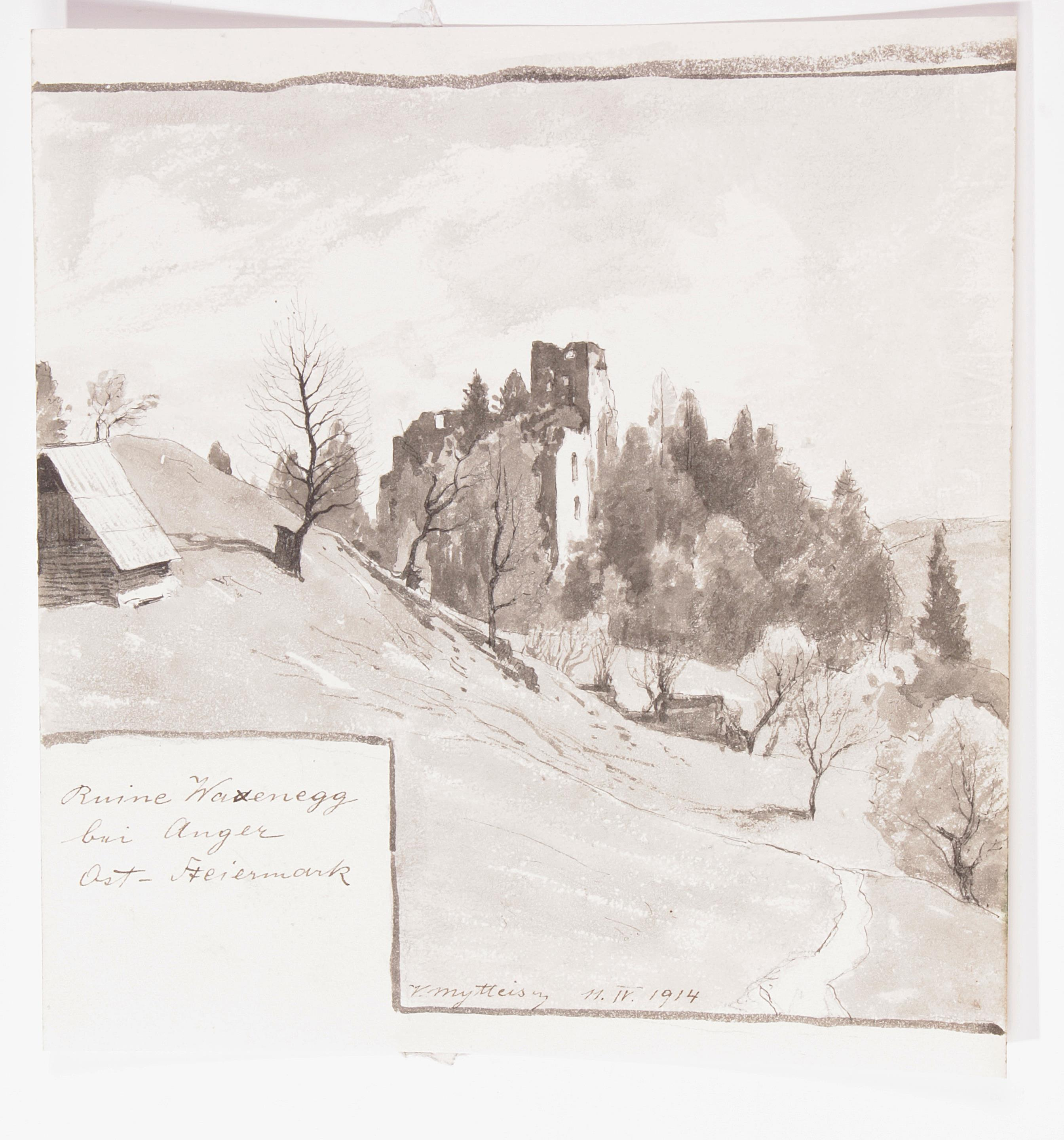
- Ruin in 1914

Site information
- Type: Hilltop castle

Site history
- Built: first mentioned 1217

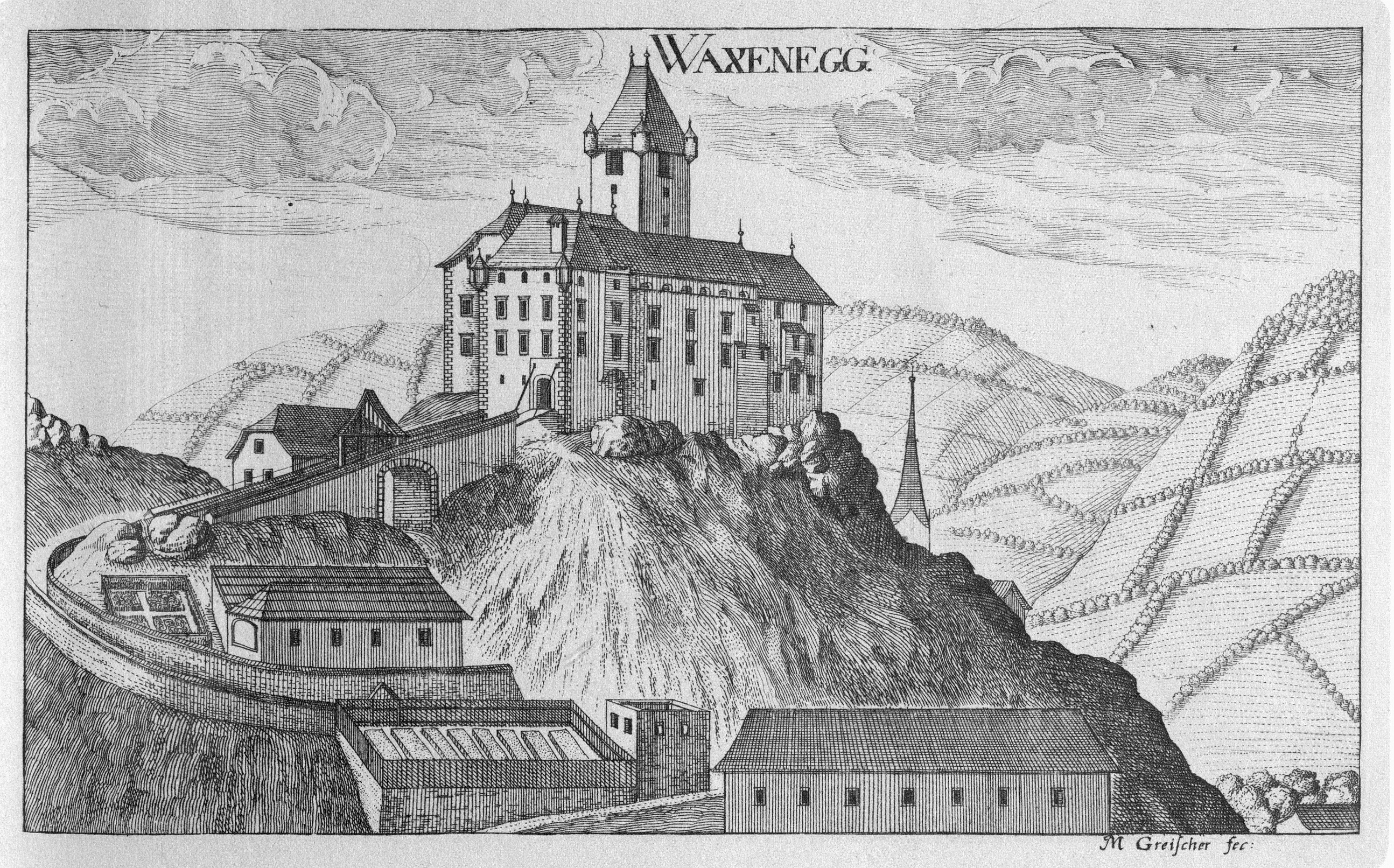
Waxenegg castle in the early 17th century

Burgruine Waxenegg is a castle ruin in the village of Naintsch in Styria, Austria.

== See also ==
- List of castles in Austria
