= Stadnicki =

Coat of arms of the Counts Stadnicki (1788)

The Stadnicki family is an old Polish noble family, named after the village of Stadnik in Poland.

== History ==
The family can trace it's noble lineage until the second half of the 13th century. There were two lines of the family. En elder branch went extinct in 1919, while a youger branch obtained the herediatry title of Count in Galicia, on 12 December 1788, from Emperor Joseph II.

== Properties ==
In the second half of the 19th century, through inheritance, they became the owners of Vranov nad Dyjí Castle. They were also the owmers of Nawojowa castle in Poland.

== Notable members ==
- Fortunat Stadnicki (1818–1872), Polish landowner
- Franciszek Stadnicki (1742–1810), Polish noble, deputy to the sejm (Polish parliament)
- Stanisław Stadnicki (1551–1610), Polish nobleman
