= Podyjí National Park =

National park in the Czech Republic

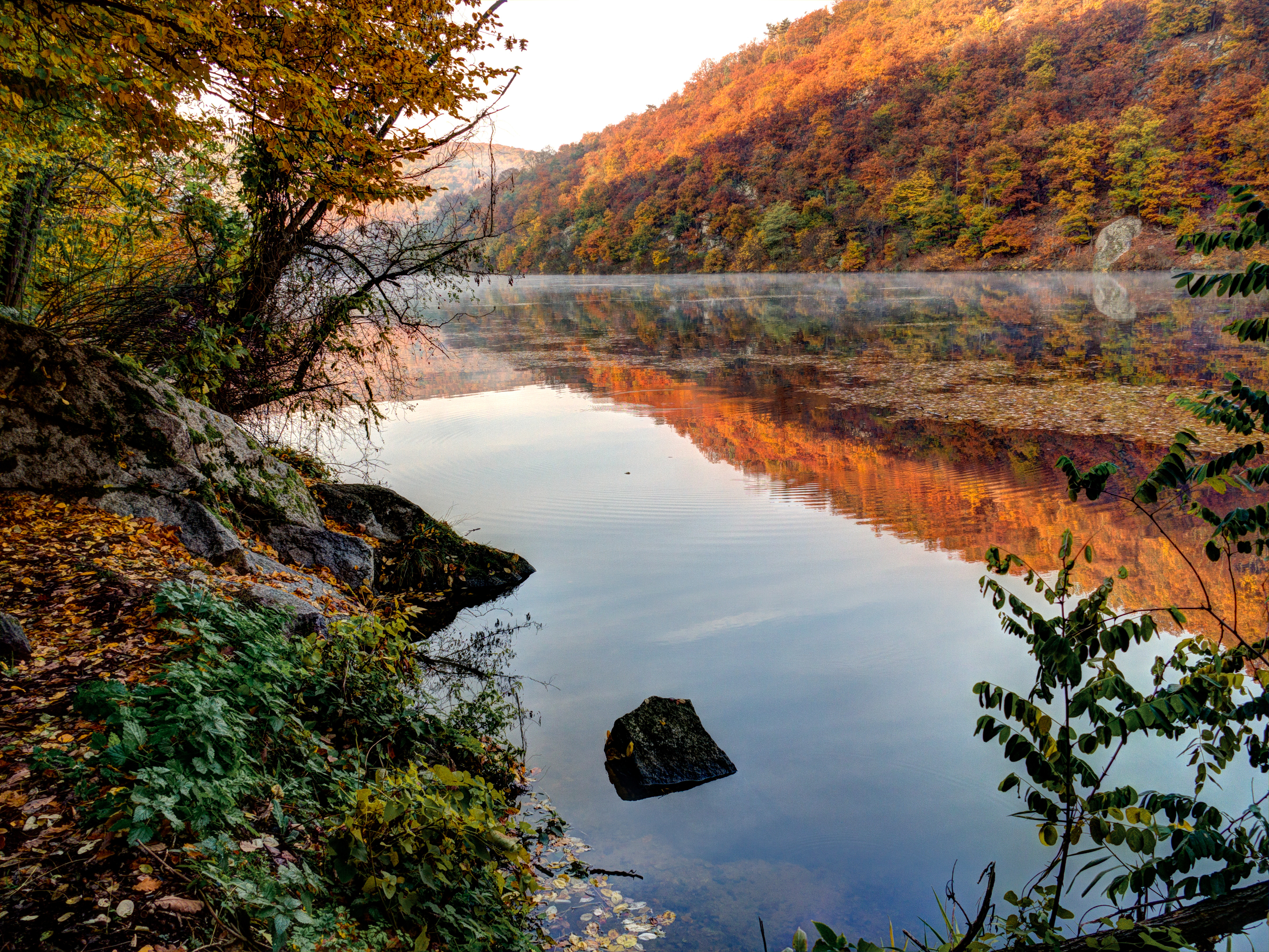

- Location within Czech Republic
- Location: South Moravian, Czech Republic
- Coordinates: 48°51′N 15°54′E
- Length: 15 km (9.3 mi)
- Width: 8 km (5.0 mi)
- Area: 63 km^{2} (24 sq mi)
- Established: 1991-07-01
- Operator: Správa NP Podyjí
- Website: www.nppodyji.cz

Podyjí National Park (Czech: Národní park Podyjí) is a national park in the South Moravian Region of the Czech Republic. Adjacent to Austria's Thayatal National Park on the border, together they are referred to as the Inter-National park. Podyjí is one of the Czech Republic's four national parks. It protects near-natural forests along the deep Dyje River valley. The well-preserved state of the biome of the park is cited as being unique in Central Europe.

== Legal status ==
Podyjí National Park is one of the four national parks of the Czech Republic. It has an area of 63 square kilometres (24 sq mi) and buffer zone of 29 square kilometres (11 sq mi). It was formally declared a national park on 1 July 1991 by government order no. 164/1991. BirdLife International (IBA) has included this park under its criteria C6, covering a larger area of 76.66 square kilometres (29.60 sq mi). In February 2025, a new director, Pavel Müller, will take up his duties.

On February 1, 2026, environmentalist, and longtime director of the park, Tomáš Rothröckl died.

== Geography ==
Podyjí National Park lies in an elevation range of 534–214 metres (1,752–702 ft). Its habitats include forest, grassland, arable land, shrubland, rocky areas and inland wetlands. The park is drained by the Dyje River, which flows for a length of 40 kilometres (25 mi) through the park in a thickly-forested valley within the Českomoravská vrchovina uplands. The river valley's depth measures up 220 metres (720 ft). Land use has been established for nature conservation and research, forestry and agriculture. Park trails lead to the castle ruins of Nový Hrádek, Hardegg Castle, and Vranov nad Dyjí Chateau.

== Wildlife ==
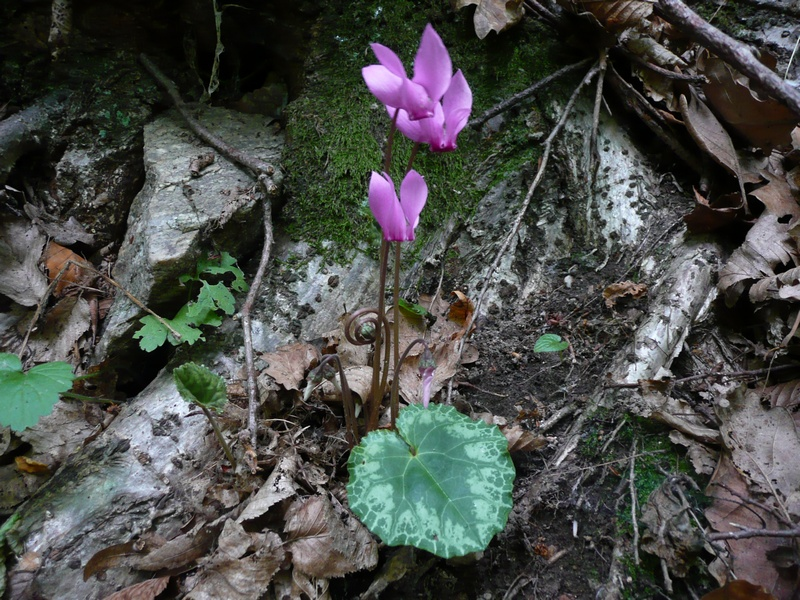
Cyclamen in Podyjí NP

The park's valley is home to 77 species of plants, which include oak woods (acidophilous and temperate type), hornbeam, beech, and alder. Some of the perennial flowering species are cyclamen, mulleins, and pasque flower. The upper plateau, which was denuded by logging and converted to cultivable land, contains grasslands. Along the riverbeds, reed-beds or willow shrubs are noted. Eighteen species of orchids have been recorded.

152 species of bird have been recorded in the park. The IBA trigger species recorded are Syrian woodpecker (Dendrocopos syriacus) and Barred warbler (Sylvia nisoria). The faunal species recorded consist of 65 species of mammals. There are seven species of reptiles, which include a tree snake and green lizard.

== Viticulture ==
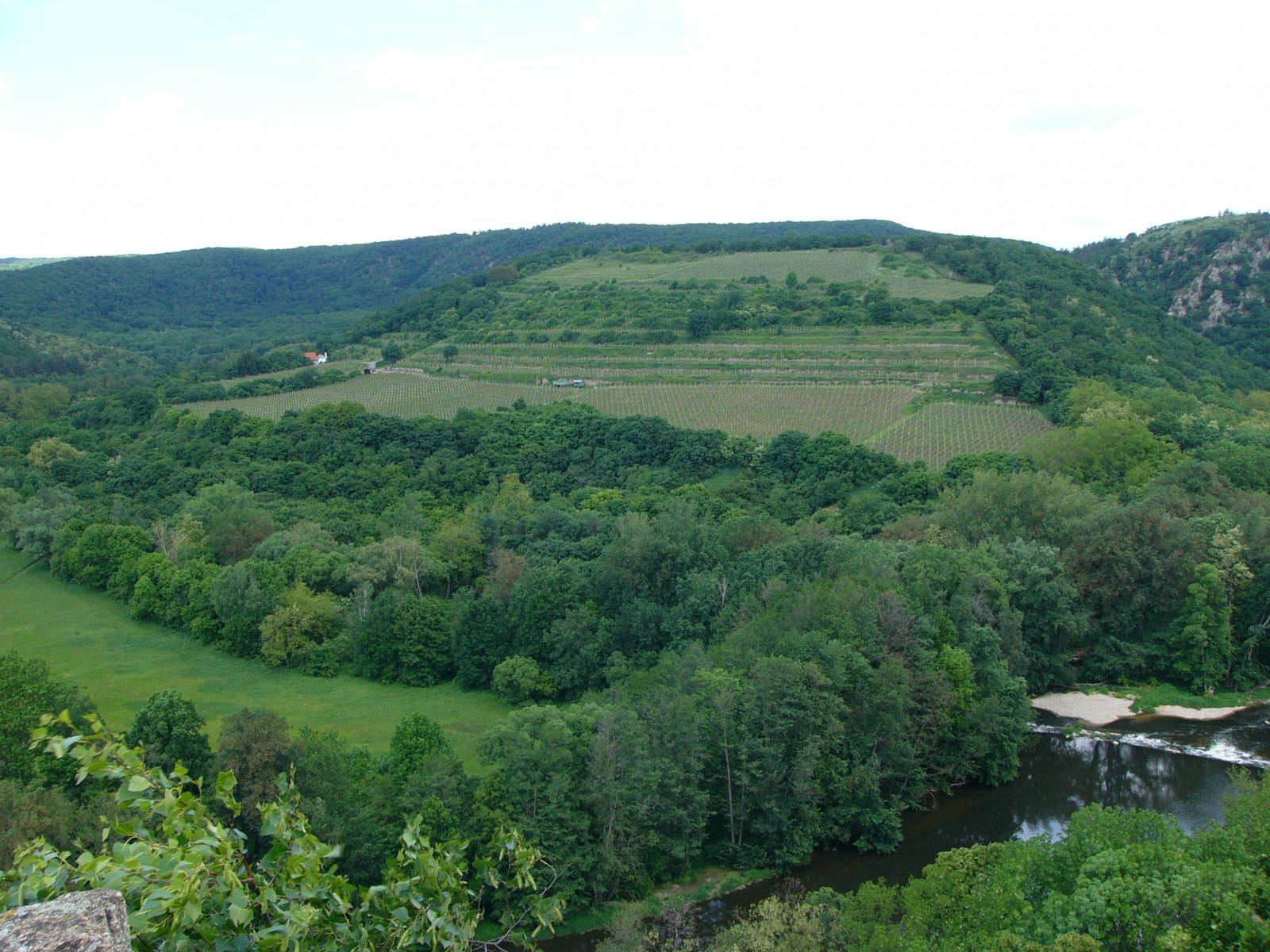
Šobes (or Šobes Hill)

Šobes (or Hora Šobes, English: Šobes Hill), one of the oldest and most renowned vineyard tracks in the Czech Republic, is situated in the park. In 2014, the company Znovín Znojmo which owns 70% of the vineyards at Šobes, started efforts to place the area on the list of UNESCO World Natural Heritage Site. Šobes contains approximately 12 hectares of vineyards.

== Bibliography ==
- Cilek, Vaclav (27 March 2015). To Breathe with Birds: A Book of Landscapes. University of Pennsylvania Press. ISBN 978-0-8122-4681-0.
- Duca, Marc Di (2006). Czech Republic: The Bradt Travel Guide. Bradt Travel Guides. ISBN 978-1-84162-150-0.
- USA, IBP (1 January 2012). Czech Republic Doing Business for Everyone Guide - Practical Information and Contacts. Lulu.com. ISBN 978-1-4387-7197-7.
