= Vranov nad Dyjí Castle =

National monument of the Czech Republic

- Zámek Vranov nad Dyjí
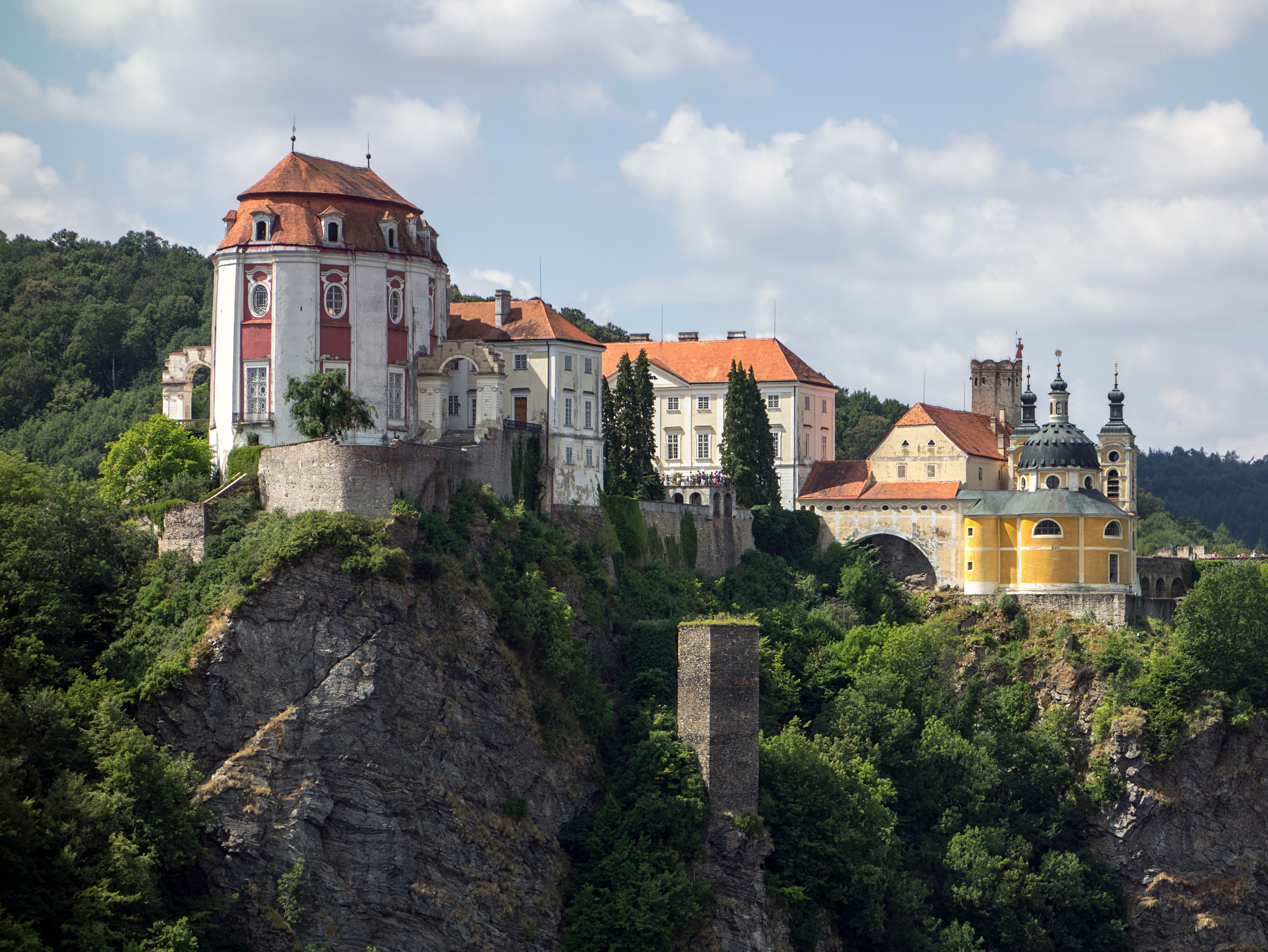

- Location in the Czech Republic

General information
- Type: Castle
- Architectural style: Baroque (parts in Gothic and Renaissance)
- Location: Vranov nad Dyjí, South Moravian Region, Czech Republic
- Coordinates: 48°53′41″N 15°48′45″E
- Opening: c. 1100

Technical details
- Material: stone, brick

Design and construction
- Architects: Johann B. Fischer of Erlach; Anton Erhard Martinelli

Website
- www.zamekvranov.cz/en/uvod

Vranov nad Dyjí (Czech: Zámek Vranov nad Dyjí) is a castle in the homonymic market town of Vranov nad Dyjí in the South Moravian Region, Czech Republic. It lies on the Thaya, 3 km (2 mi) north from the Austrian border close to Hardegg.

== History ==
Vranov's location was first mentioned in Chronica Boemorum by Cosmas of Prague in 1100 as a border sentry castle (oppidum (et) castrum Wranou). It was built by the Dukes of Bohemia to defend the southern border of Moravia against raids from the neighbouring Austrian March. Until 1323 the castle was in royal hands but in that year king John of Bohemia pawned Vranov to a powerful Bohemian nobleman, the viceroy Jindřich of Lipá.

In 1421, during the disturbances of the Hussite Wars the Bohemian noble family of Lichtenburg took control of the castle and the contiguous market town. In 1499 it definitely passed on to Lichtenburgs as hereditary possession by the king Vladislaus II of Bohemia and Hungary. The Lichtenburg family held Vranov for almost a century, until 1516.

In the 16th century, Vranov frequently changed the holders (chronologically: lords of Boskovice, Pernštejn family, lords of Lomnice, Kraigers of Krajk and Dietrichstein family). Probably the most significant owners were lords from the Bavarian family of Althann, cousins of the Princes of Belmonte. Wolf Dietrich of Althann purchased the castle in 1614. Nevertheless, seven years later the manor was confiscated due to his participation in the rebellion of the Bohemian Estates. The confiscated castle was consequently sold to one of the Albrecht von Wallenstein's generals, Johann Ernst of Scherfenberg.

Michael Johann II Althann recovered the Vranov estate for the family in 1680. He commissioned the famous Austrian architect Johann Bernhard Fischer von Erlach to design a grand hall, known as 'the Hall of the Ancestors' in the Baroque style as a memorial to his Althann ancestors. It was built between 1687 and 1695. It's an oval construction surmounted by an imposing cupola and became a dominant feature of Vranov. An Austrian sculptor, Tobias Kracker, created large statues of the ancestors in niches around the walls and another Austrian artist, Johann Michael Rottmayr, painted an allegorical glorification of the Althann family in the cupola. To complement the Hall of the Ancestors with a spiritual element, Fischer von Erlach designed a Baroque chapel, the Chapel of the Holy Trinity, which incorporated an Althann family vault. The richly decorated chapel was built in two years (1699 and 1670). After the death of Michael Johann II Althann more grand buildings were constructed, completing the transformation of the original castle complex into an up-to-date Baroque castle.

In 1799, the castle became the property of Count Stanislaw Mniszech (1774–1846). Through inheritance, it later came into the hands of the Stadnicki family. After them, von der Wense, German noble family which originated in the Duchy of Brunswick-Lüneburg, owned the castle until WWII.

== Gallery ==
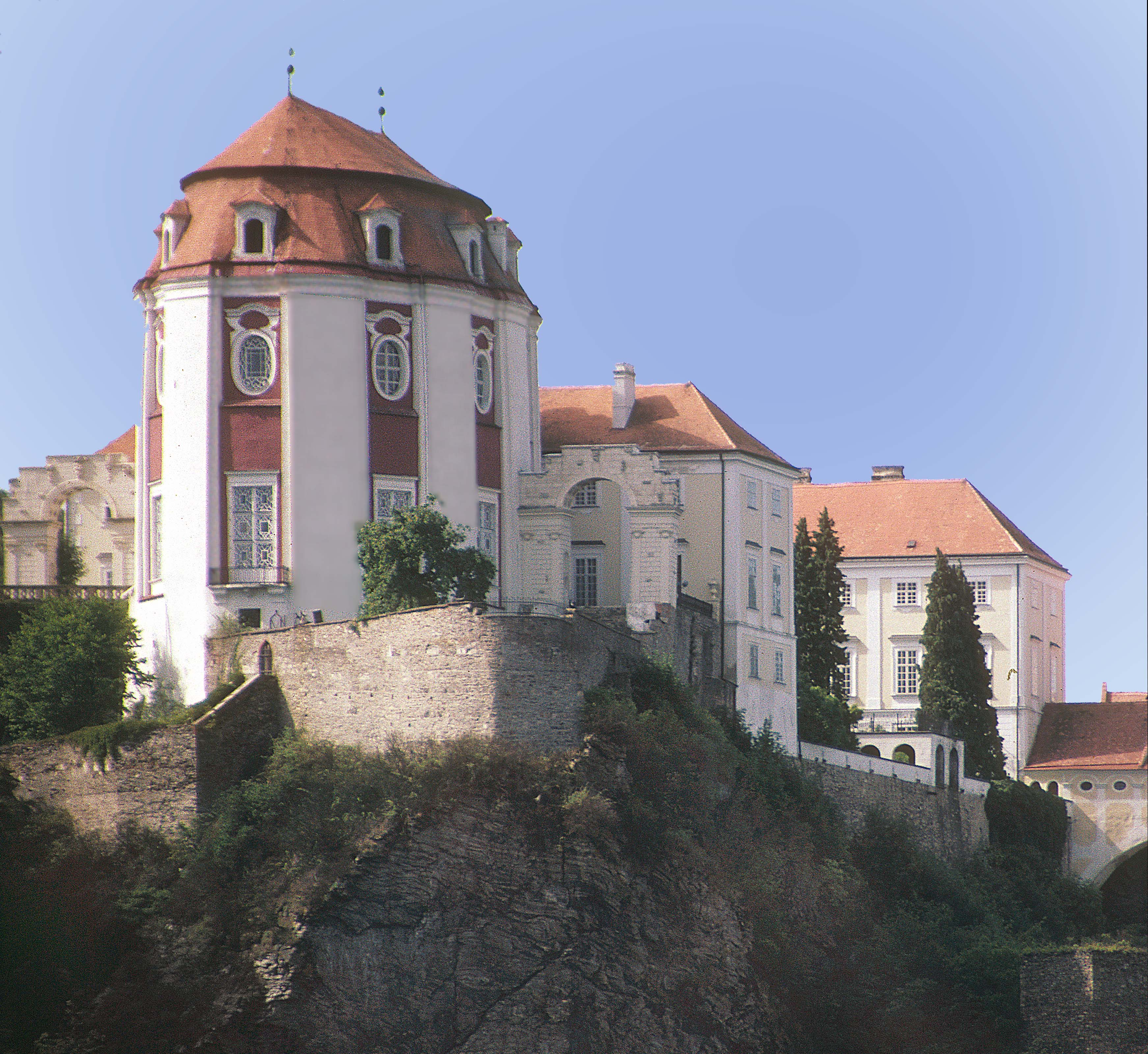
The Hall of the Ancestors, exterior

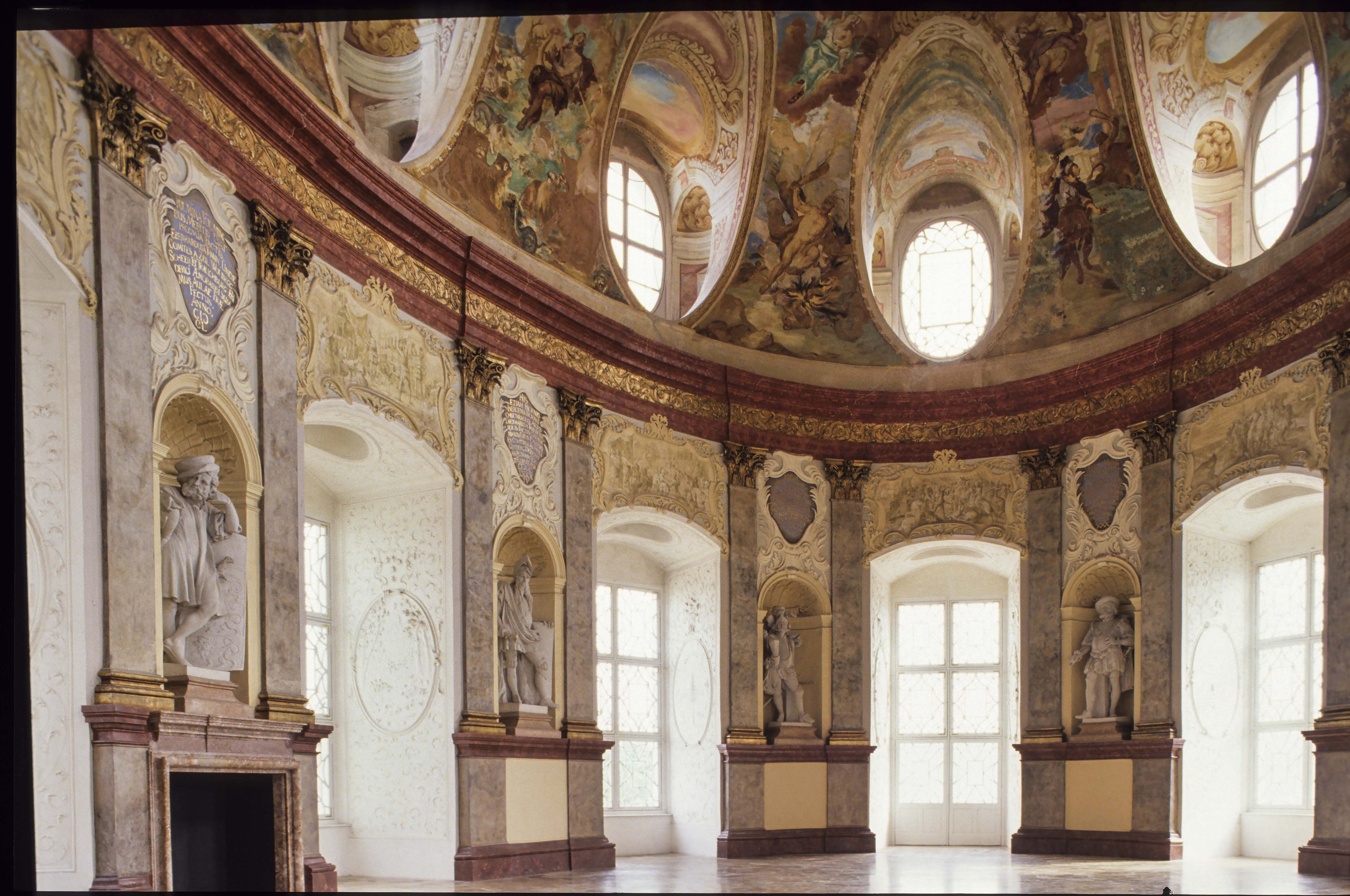
The Hall of the Ancestors, interior

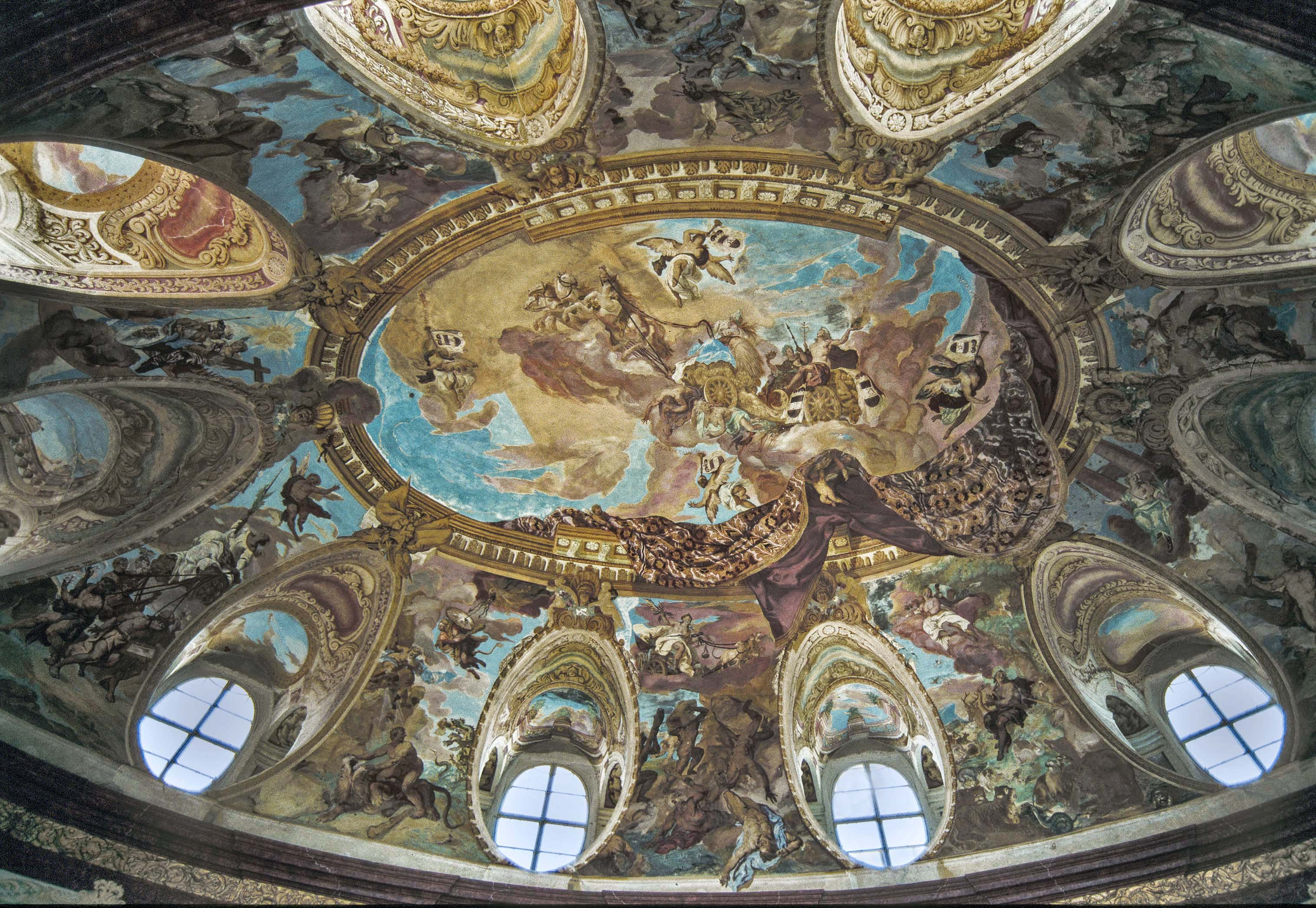
Cupola of the Hall of the Ancestors

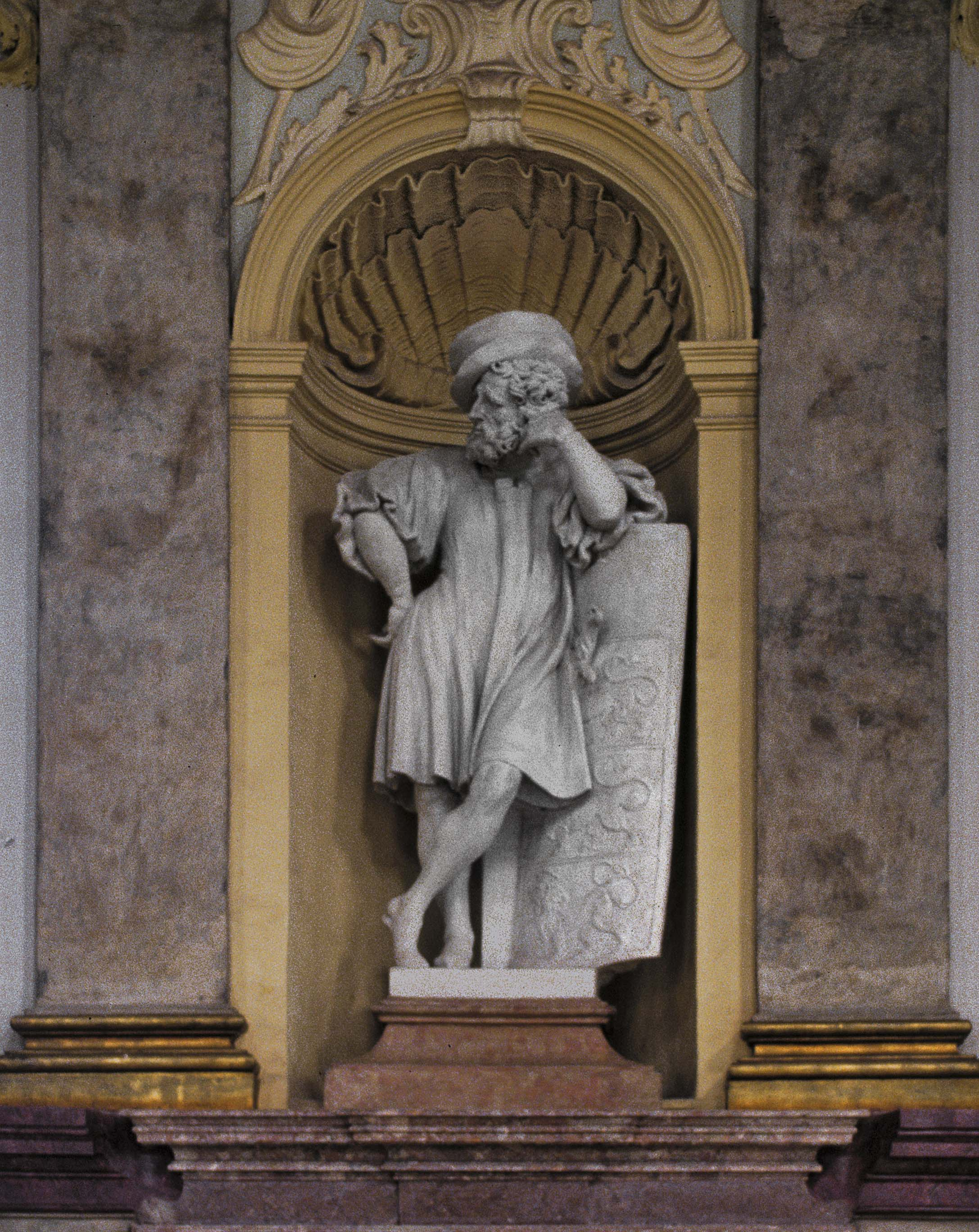
One of the ancestors in the Hall of the Ancestors

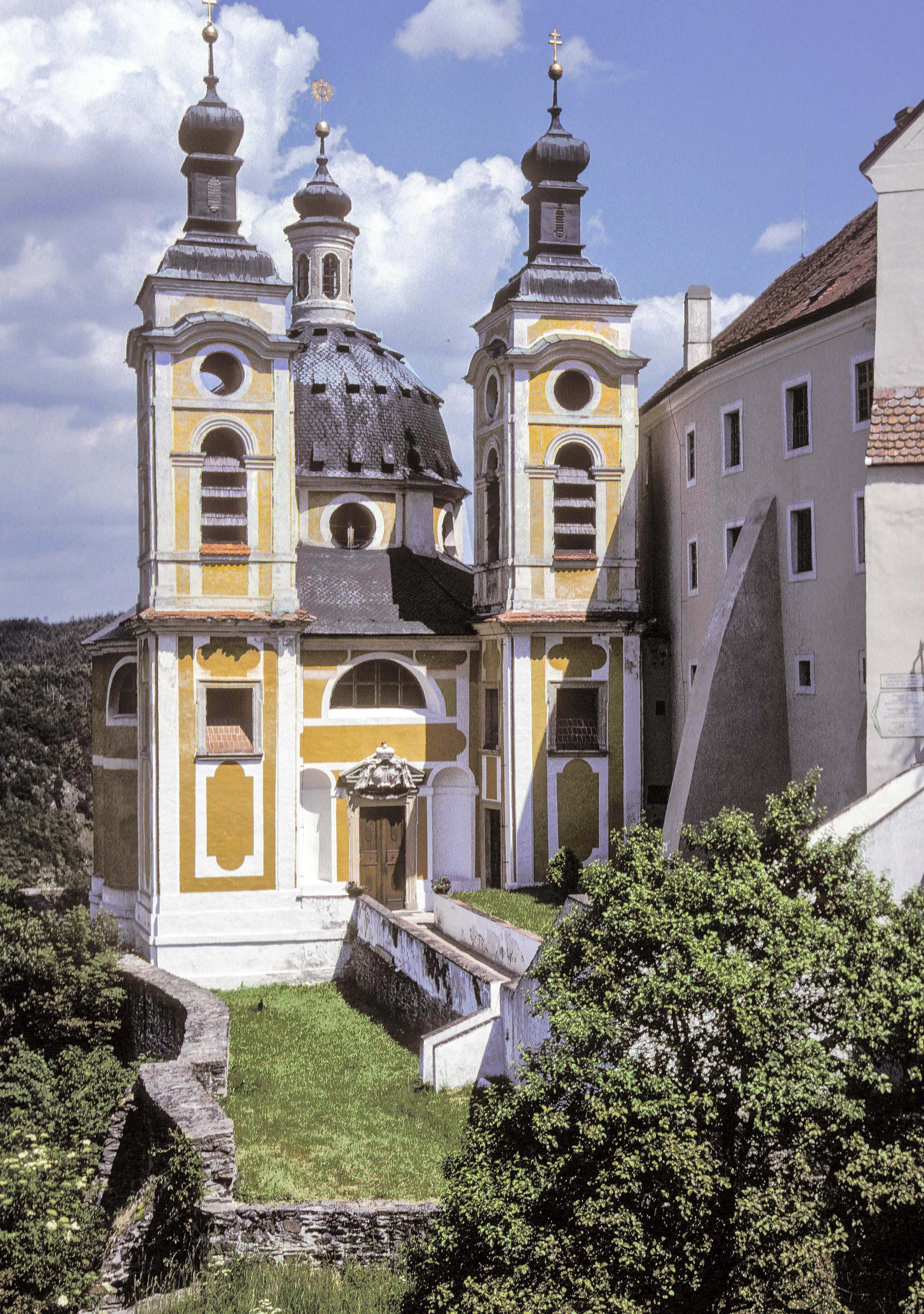
Chapel of the Holy Trinity

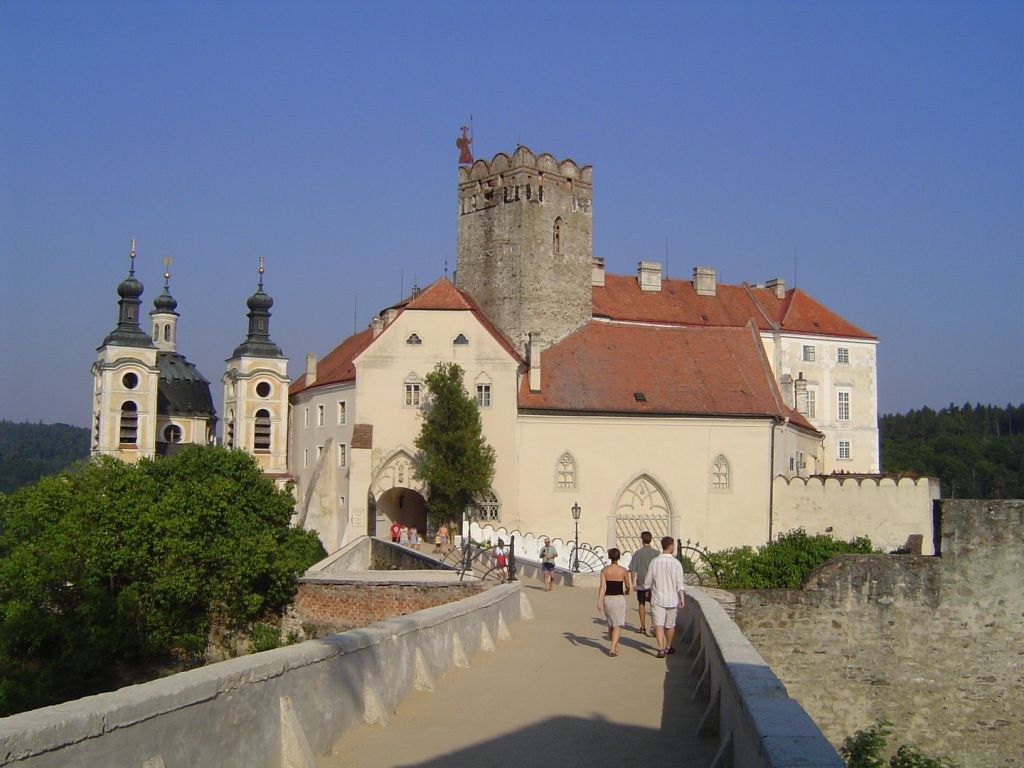
View from the west. In the middle is situated the Gothic watchtower upon the main gateway, on the left is the Holy Trinity Chapel with crypt of the Althann family beneath.

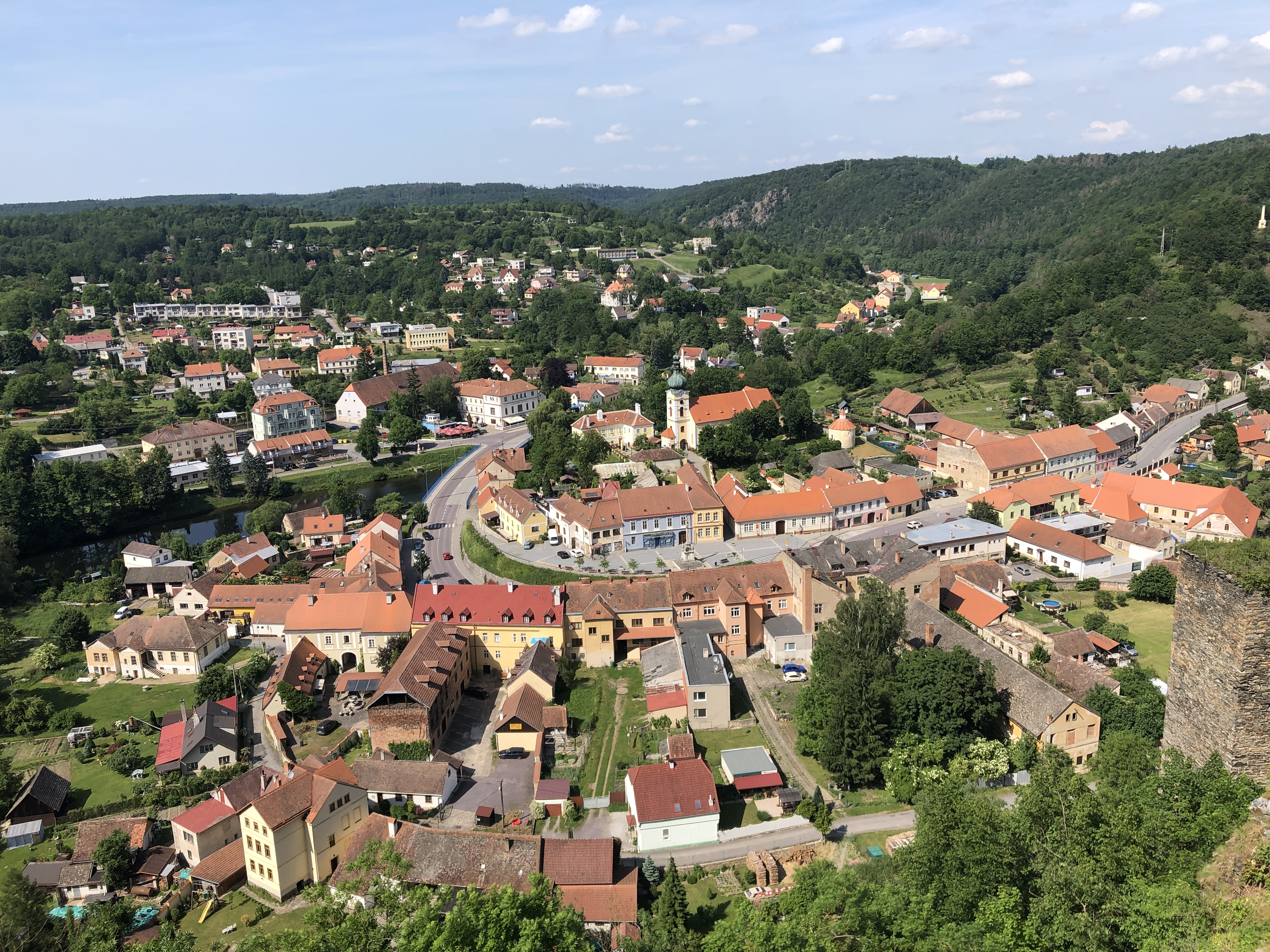
The market town of Vranov nad Dyjí as seen from the castle
