= Weitersfeld =

- Municipality
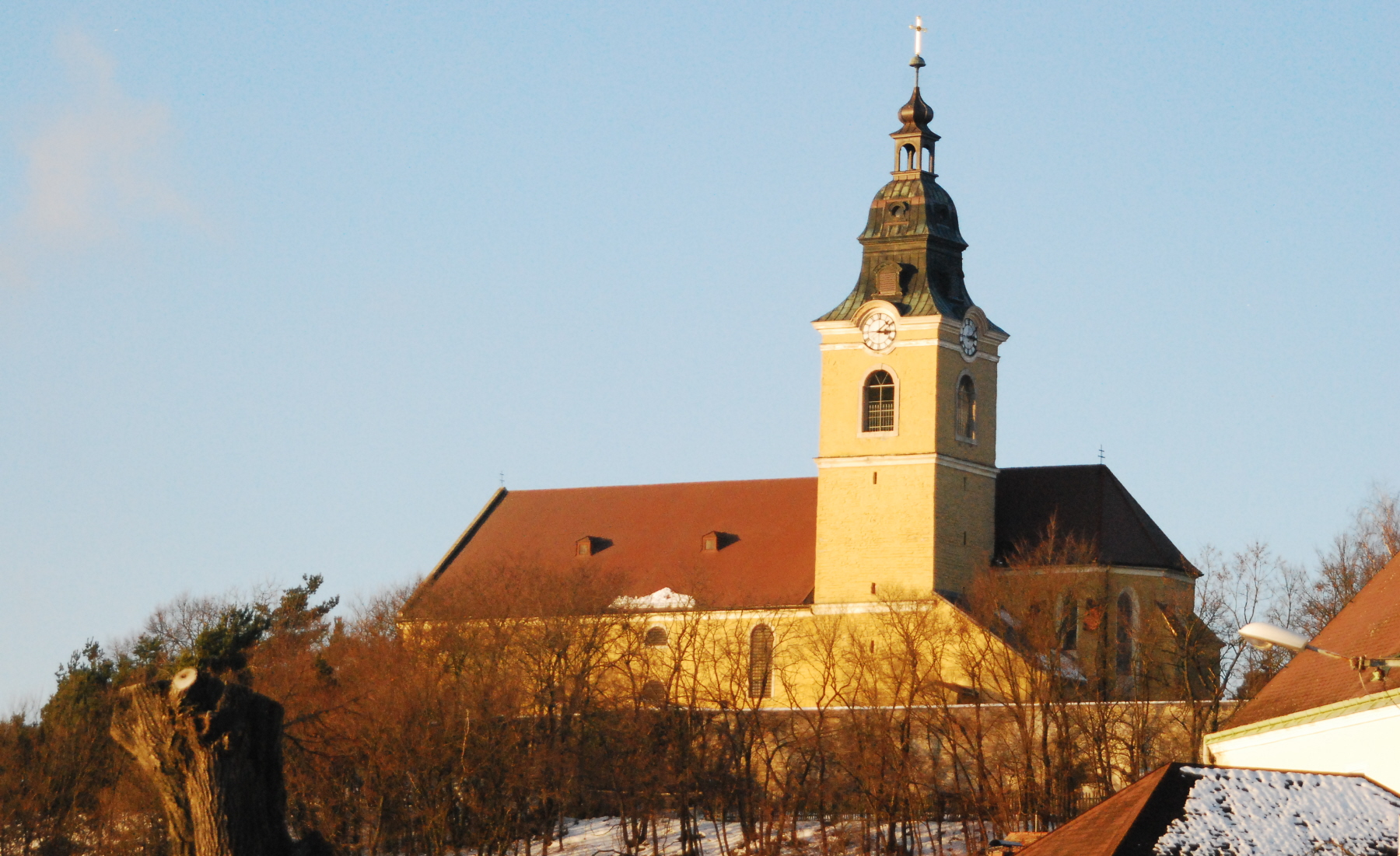
- Weitersfeld parish church

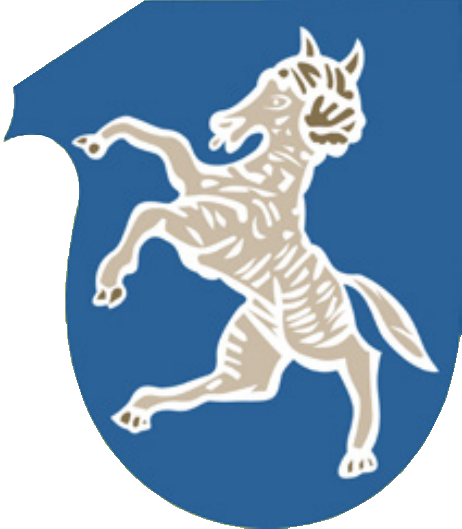
- Coat of arms

- Location within Austria
- Coordinates: 48°46′56″N 15°48′40″E
- Country: Austria
- State: Lower Austria
- District: Horn

Government
  - Mayor: Werner Neubert

Area
  - Total: 87.18 km^{2} (33.66 sq mi)
- Elevation: 441 m (1,447 ft)

Population (2018-01-01)
  - Total: 1,576
  - Density: 18.08/km^{2} (46.82/sq mi)
- Time zone: UTC+1 (CET)
  - Summer (DST): UTC+2 (CEST)
- Postal code: 2084
- Area code: 02948
- Website: www.weitersfeld.at

Weitersfeld is a town in the district of Horn in Lower Austria, Austria.

== Population ==
Historical population
| Year | Pop. | ±% |
|---|---|---|
| 1923 | 2,888 | — |
| 1951 | 2,611 | −9.6% |
| 1961 | 2,505 | −4.1% |
| 1971 | 2,293 | −8.5% |
| 1981 | 2,074 | −9.6% |
| 1991 | 1,842 | −11.2% |
| 2001 | 1,753 | −4.8% |
| 2011 | 1,652 | −5.8% |
