= Naintsch =

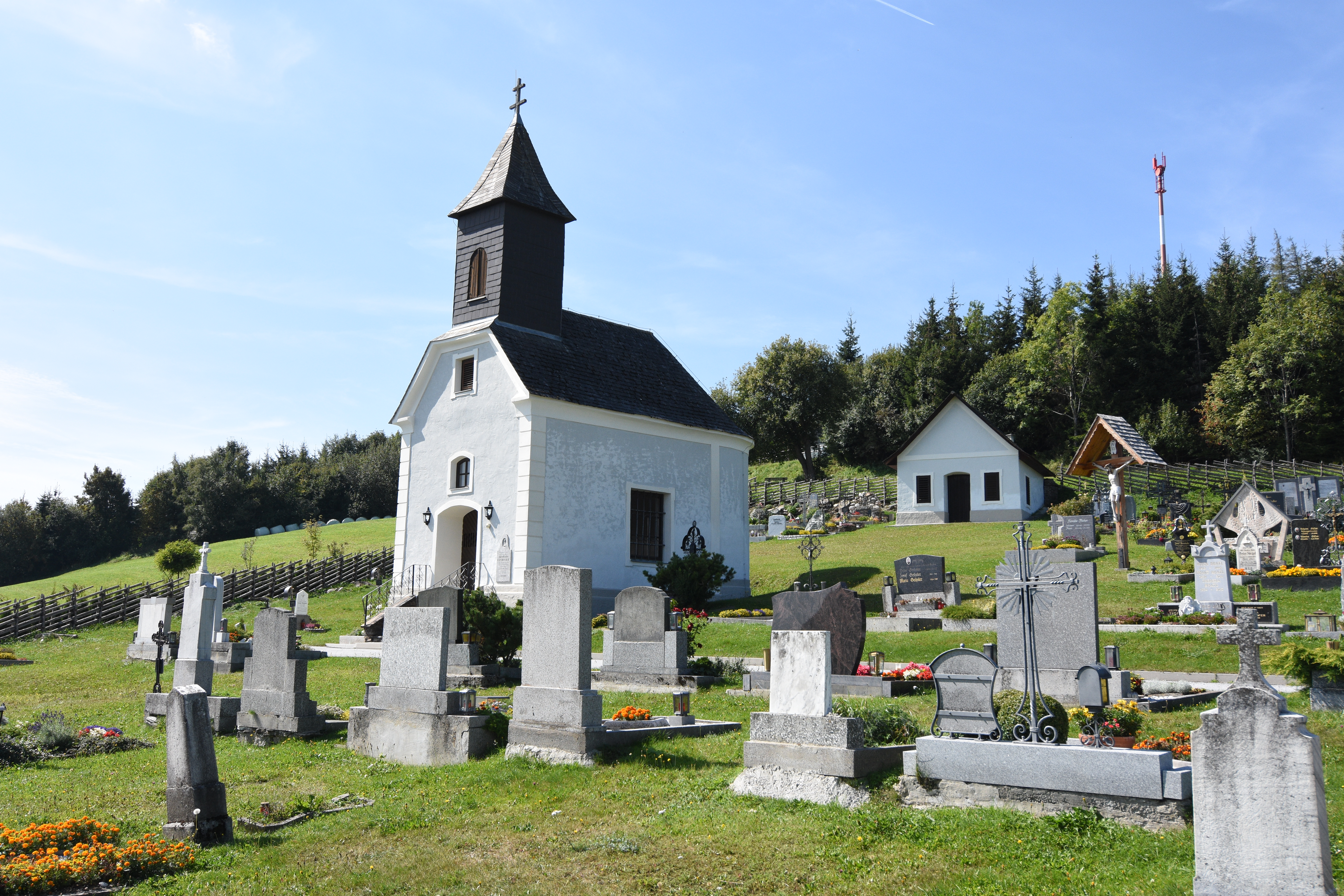
- Naintsch chapel and cemetery

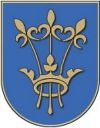
- Coat of arms

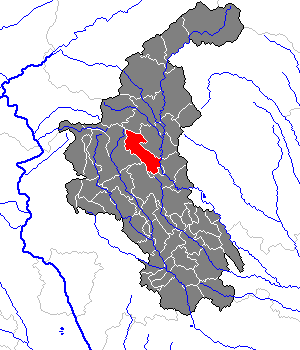
- Location within Weiz district

- Location within Austria
- Coordinates: 47°20′16″N 15°36′35″E
- Country: Austria
- State: Styria
- District: Weiz

Government
  - Mayor: Herbert Schoberer (ÖVP)

Area
  - Total: 27.58 km^{2} (10.65 sq mi)
- Elevation: 1,032 m (3,386 ft)

Population (1 January 2016)
  - Total: 596
  - Density: 21.6/km^{2} (56.0/sq mi)
- Time zone: UTC+1 (CET)
  - Summer (DST): UTC+2 (CEST)
- Postal code: 8172 (Heilbrunn), 8184 (Anger)
- Area code: 03175, 03179
- Vehicle registration: WZ
- Website: www.naintsch.at

Naintsch is a former municipality in the district of Weiz in the Austrian state of Styria. Since the 2015 Styria municipal structural reform, it is part of the municipality Anger.
