= Hardegg =

- Municipality
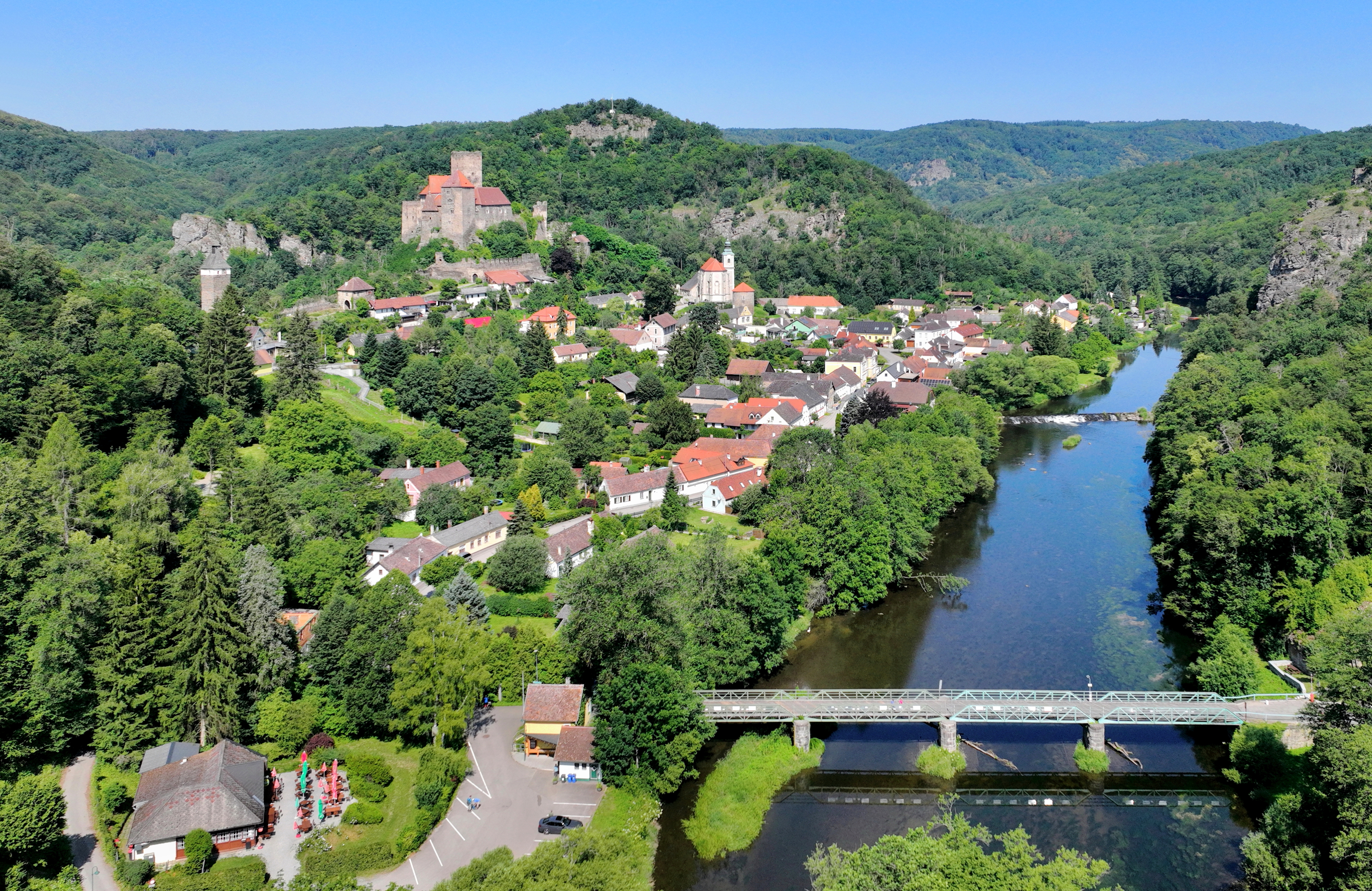
- Hardegg town and castle

- Coat of arms

- Location within Austria
- Coordinates: 48°51′N 15°52′E
- Country: Austria
- State: Lower Austria
- District: Hollabrunn

Government
  - Mayor: Heribert Donnerbauer (ÖVP)

Area
  - Total: 93.23 km^{2} (36.00 sq mi)
- Elevation: 309 m (1,014 ft)

Population (2018-01-01)
  - Total: 1,309
  - Density: 14.04/km^{2} (36.36/sq mi)
- Time zone: UTC+1 (CET)
  - Summer (DST): UTC+2 (CEST)
- Postal code: 2082
- Area code: 0 29 48
- Website: www.hardegg.gv.at

Hardegg (German pronunciation: [haʁˈdɛk]) is a town in the district of Hollabrunn in Lower Austria, Austria. It is situated in the Waldviertel region on the river Thaya, directly on the border with the Czech Republic. The Thaya valley is protected as the Thayatal National Park, adjacent to the Podyjí National Park on the Czech shore.

Since 1975 the municipality comprises the Katastralgemeinden of Hardegg, Felling, Heufurth, Mallersbach, Merkersdorf, Niederfladnitz, Pleissing, Riegersburg, Umlauf (unpopulated, is entirely located within the Thayatal national park and comprises a mere 12 fishermen's huts), and Waschbach. Hardegg is often referred to as "Austria's smallest city": for historical reasons, the municipality has city status (German: Stadtrecht), but Hardegg proper only has 78 inhabitants.

== History ==
Hardegg Castle in the March of Austria was first mentioned in an 1145 deed, it was acquired by the Counts of Plain about 1187. Hardegg itself is first documented as a town in 1290. Located on the border with the Kingdom of Bohemia, the area was devastated during the Hussite Wars in 1425. In 1483 Hardegg was bequeathed to the Habsburg archdukes of Austria.

Emperor Maximilian I granted Hardegg to his ministeriales of the Prueschenk noble family and elevated them to immediate Counts of Hardegg in 1499. Two years later Count Ulrich purchased the Bohemian County of Kladsko from the Dukes of Münsterberg. From the Thirty Years' War onwards the castle decayed, until it was acquired by the Khevenhüller dynasty and rebuilt in the late 19th century according to plans designed by Carl Gangolf Kayser.

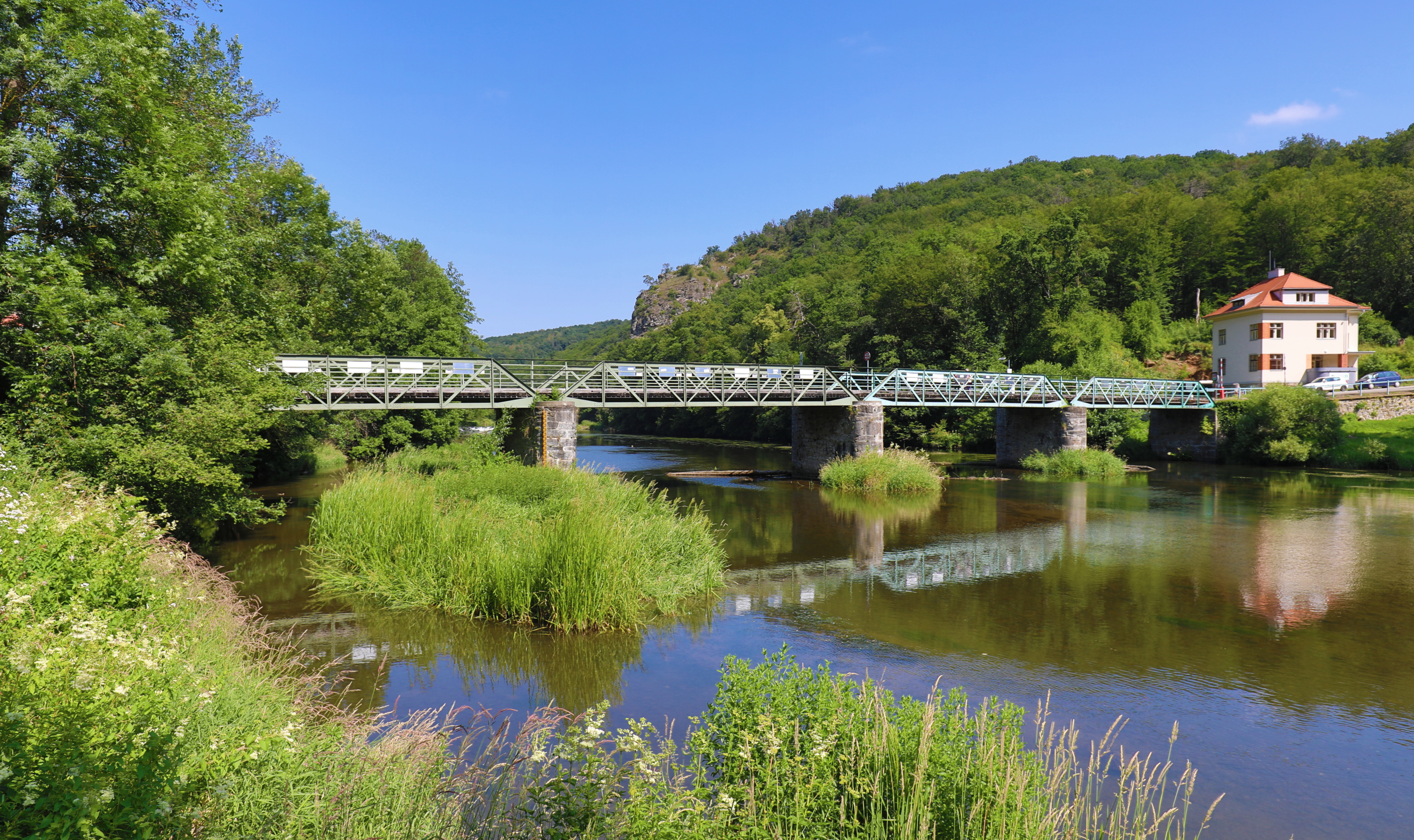
Thaya bridge

After World War II until the fall of the Iron Curtain, Hardegg was particularly isolated. The only connection to the Czech Republic is via a bridge built in 1874 across the Thaya to the neighbouring village of Čížov (part of the Horní Břečkov municipality) in Moravia.

== Economy and infrastructure ==
The town's remote situation was also mirrored in a decreasing number of inhabitants. Its only positive economical factor today is tourism. The highest population ever officially recorded was in 1890 — a total of 3,209. Ever since, except for the period between 1939 and 1951, the number of inhabitants has been steadily decreasing. This is typical for the Hollabrunn district which has had no population increase since 1980.

In 2001 there were 56 non-agricultural businesses, according to a 1999 census there were 108 farmsteads and forestral businesses. In 2001 the number of economically active persons was 597, the employment ratio was at 40.8%. In Riegerburg there is a former coal mine and Felling is the seat of RM Austria – Perlmuttdesign, Austria's last mother of pearl turnery. In Mallersbach and Niederfladnitz, kaolinite was mined.

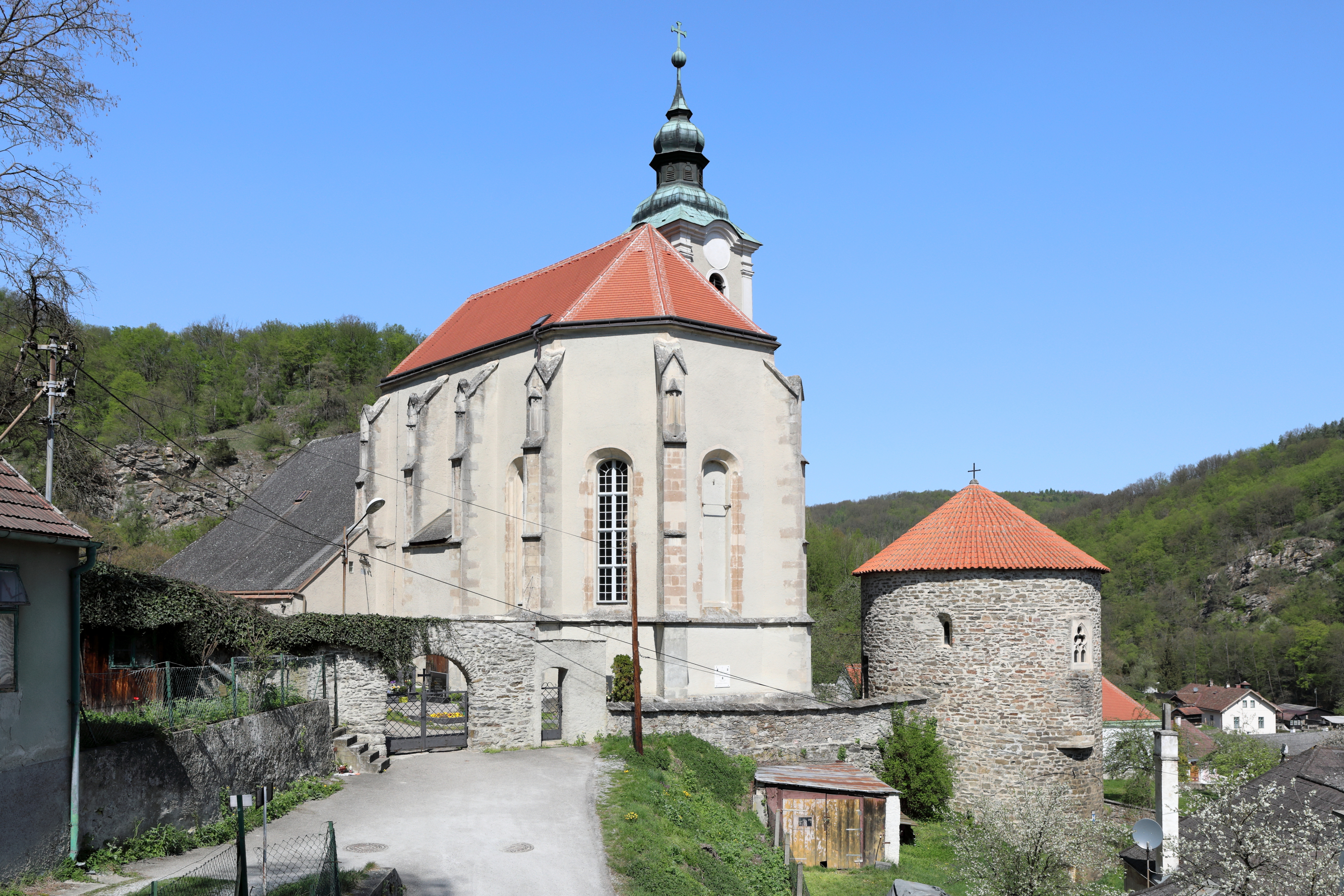
Parish church and ossuary

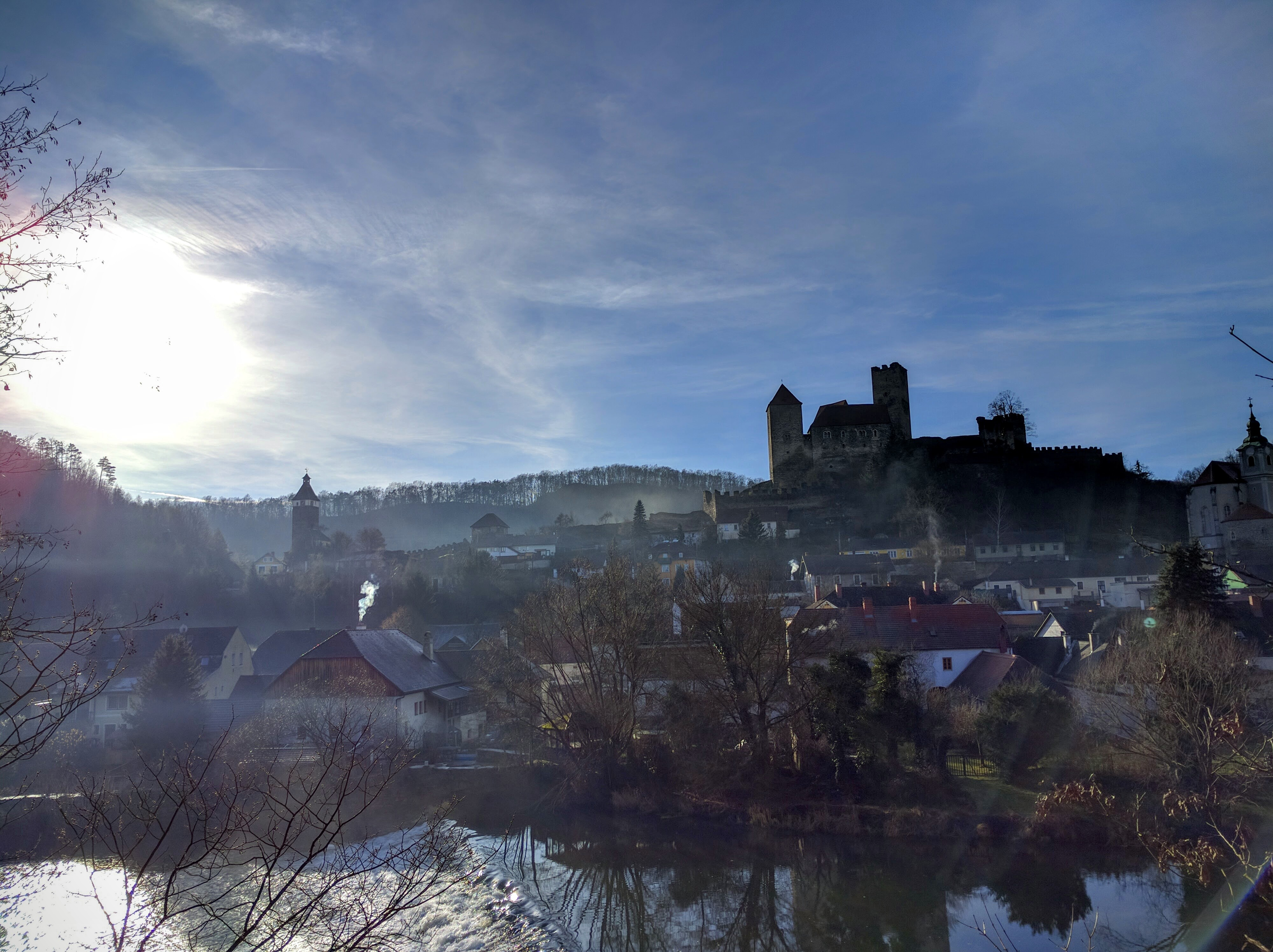
Hardegg town and castle in winter, viewed from the Czech side of the Thaya river

After the seasonal opening of the Thaya bridge border crossing from Hardegg to Čížov on 12 April 1990, the crossing point was opened hourly throughout the year for pedestrians, cyclists and skiers on 9 May 2006. In July the crossing Felling to Podmyče was opened to pedestrians and cyclists. After the expansion of the European Union's Schengen Area, the border may now be crossed anywhere at any time and formal checkpoints are obsolete.

== Politics ==
As of 2010, Heribert Donnerbauer of the Austrian People's Party (ÖVP) is the town's mayor. The council comprises 19 seats divided as follows after the 14 March 2010 elections: ÖVP 15, SPÖ 4.

== Sights ==
- Annual Retzerland pumpkin festival
- Brick pillars of a former gallows between Niederfladnitz and Oberretzbach
- Hardegg Castle
- Riegersburg Castle
- Ruins of Kaja Castle near Merkersdorf
- Thayatal National Park

== Notable people ==
- Freddy Quinn (born 1931 in Niederfladnitz), singer and musician

=== Honorary citizens ===
- Erwin Pröll, governor of Lower Austria
