= Burg Hardegg =

Castle in Austria

Coordinates: 48°51′16″N 15°51′27″E

- Lower Austria, Austria
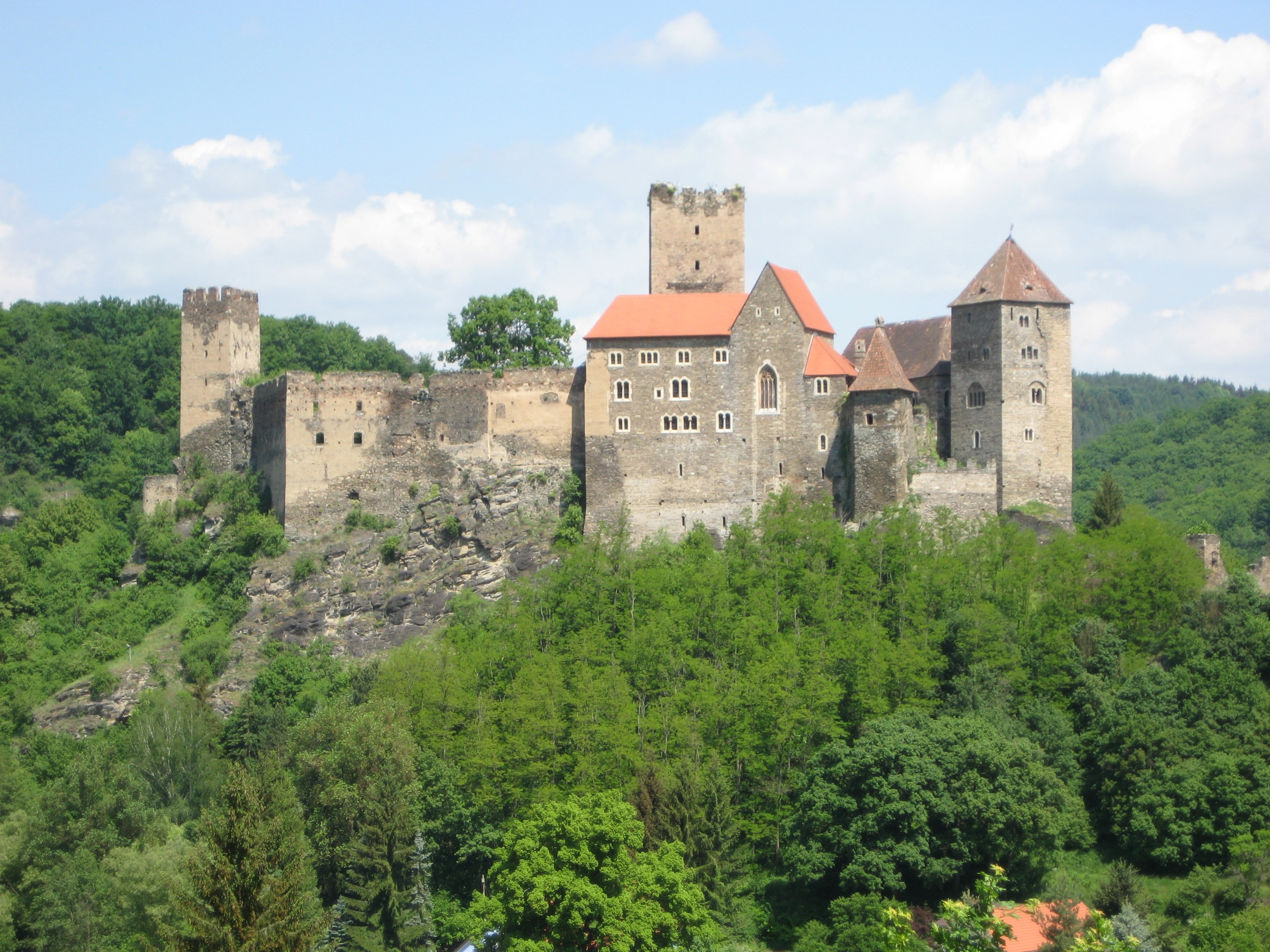
- Burg Hardegg

Site information
- Type: Castle

Burg Hardegg is a castle in Lower Austria, Austria. Burg Hardegg is 317 metres (1,040 ft) above sea level. It was restored in the late 19th century with the help of architect Carl Gangolf Kayser.

== See also ==
- List of castles in Austria
