= Franz, 8th Prince of Khevenhüller-Metsch =

Member of the Princely Khevenhuller family

His Serene Highness Franz von Khevenhüller-Metsch
- Prince of Khevenhüller-Metsch
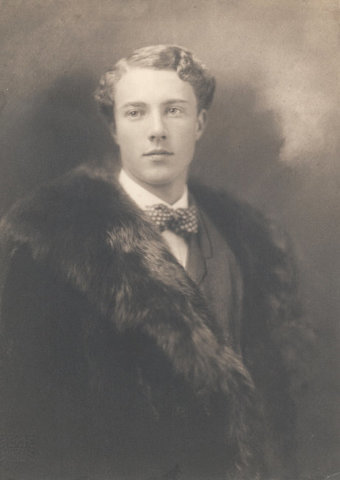
- Photograph by Hermann Clemens Kosel, 1910
- Full name: Franz Eduard Joseph Adam Othmar Leopold Hubertus Maria von Khevenhüller-Metsch
- Born: 3 December 1889; Vienna, Austria
- Died: 31 January 1977 (aged 87); St. Georgen am Längsee, Austria
- Noble family: Khevenhüller-Metsch
- Spouse: Princess Anna von Fürstenberg (m. 1913; died 1928)
- Issue: Countess Irma von Khevenhüller-Metsch; Countess Melanie von Khevenhüller-Metsch; Maximilian, 9th Prince of Khevenhüller-Metsch; Countess Helene von Khevenhüller-Metsch
- Father: Count Alfred von Khevenhüller-Metsch
- Mother: Countess Melanie Ernesztina Erdõdy de Monyorókerék et Monoszló

Franz von Khevenhüller-Metsch (Note: His full name was Franz Eduard Joseph Adam Othmar Leopold Hubertus Maria von Khevenhüller-Metsch.) (3 December 1889 – 31 January 1977), hereditary 8th Prince of Khevenhüller-Metsch, was an Austrian nobleman.

== Early life ==
Khevenhüller-Metsch was born on 3 December 1889 in Vienna, Austria. He was the son of Count Alfred von Khevenhüller-Metsch and his wife Countess Melanie Ernesztina Erdõdy de Monyorókerék et Monoszló. Among his siblings were younger brother, Count Georg Albig von Khevenhüller-Metsch and Countess Antoinette von Khevenhüller-Metsch (who married Bohuslav Kolowrat-Krakowský-Liebsteinský in 1927 and, after his death in 1934, his brother Vilém Jaroslav Kolowrat-Krakowský-Liebsteinský in 1939).

His paternal grandparents were Count Othmar Maria Johann Saturnis von Khevenhüller-Metsch (a younger brother of the 5th Prince of Khevenhüller-Metsch) and Baroness Leontine Marianne Kreß von Kressenstein (a daughter of Baron Christoph Karl Jakob Kress von Kressenstein and Countess Leopoldina Zichy). His maternal grandparents were Count Ferenc Xavér Erdõdy de Monyorókerék et Monoszló (a son of Count Kajetán Erdõdy) and Countess Maria Ilona "Helene" von Oberndorff (a daughter of Count Gustav Adolf von Oberndorff). His grandfather, Count Ferenc, was a brother of Eugénia Erdődy, who married Count György Festetics.

== Career ==
Upon the death of his distant cousin, Sigismund von Khevenhüller-Metsch, on 8 November 1945, he became the hereditary 8th Prince of Khevenhüller-Metsch (German: Fürst von Khevenhüller-Metsch). The Princely (Fürsten) title had been granted to his ancestor, Johann Joseph von Khevenhüller-Metsch, in 1763. (Note: The Khevenhüller family was mediatised in 1806, thereafter, belonging to high nobility before the German monarchies were abolished in 1918.) He was also Count of Hohen-Osterwitz and Annabuchl, Baron of Landskron and Wernberg, and Hereditary Lord of Carlsberg.

== Personal life ==
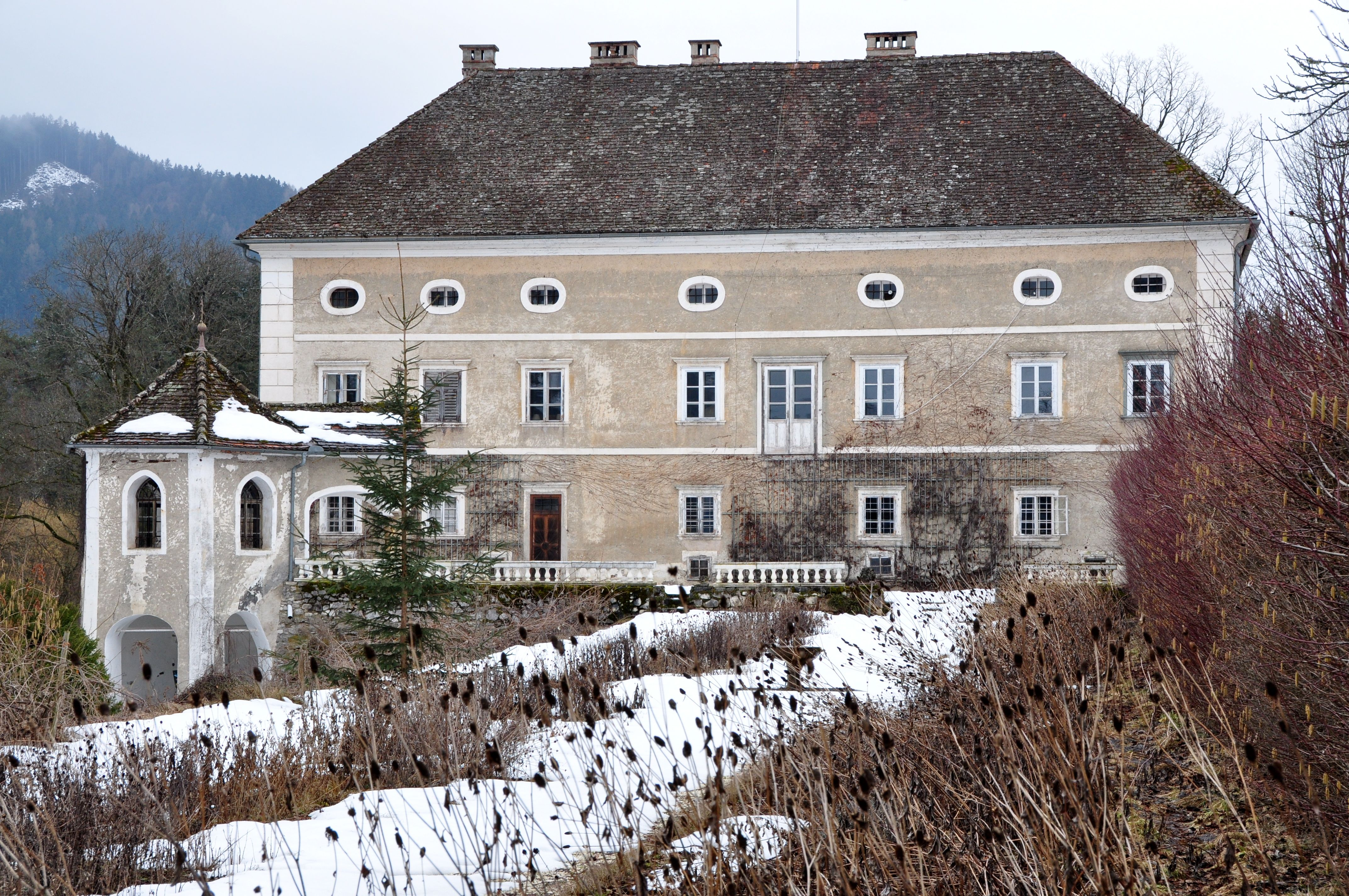
Schloss Niederosterwitz, St. Georgen am Längsee

On 16 August 1913 at Schloss Heiligenberg, he was married to Princess Anna von Fürstenberg (1894–1928), a daughter of Maximilian Egon II, Prince of Fürstenberg and the former Countess Irma von Schönborn-Buchheim. Together, they were the parents of:

- Countess Irma "Sunny" von Khevenhüller-Metsch (1914–1954), who married Silvio Scherz in 1941.
- Countess Melanie von Khevenhüller-Metsch (1915–1991), who married Count Peter Drašković de Trakošćan, a son of Count Ivan Rudolf Drašković de Trakošćan and Countess Nora von Lützow. He had previously been married to Countess Gabriella Apponyi de Nagy-Appony.
- Maximilian, 9th Prince of Khevenhüller-Metsch (1919–2010), who married Countess Wilhelmine Henckel von Donnersmarck, third child and second daughter of Count Lazarus Henckel von Donnersmarck and Countess Franziska von und zu Eltz, in 1956. Wilhelmine's older brother, Count Karl Josef Henckel von Donnersmarck, was married to Princess Marie Adelaide of Luxembourg.
- Countess Helene "Hella" von Khevenhüller-Metsch (1921–2017), who married Prince Konstantin of Bavaria, the eldest son of Prince Adalbert of Bavaria and Countess Auguste von Seefried auf Buttenheim, in 1953. After his death in a plane crash in 1969, she married Prince Eugen of Bavaria, the only son of Prince Konrad of Bavaria and Princess Maria Bona of Savoy-Genoa, in 1970.

His wife, Princess Anna, died at Freiburg on 19 August 1928 at aged 34. The Prince of Khevenhüller-Metsch died on 31 January 1977 at Schloss Niederosterwitz, St. Georgen am Längsee, Austria. He was succeeded by his eldest son, Max.
