= Maximilian, 9th Prince of Khevenhüller-Metsch =

Member of the Princely Khevenhuller family

His Serene Highness Maximilian von Khevenhüller-Metsch
- Prince of Khevenhüller-Metsch
- Full name: Maximilian Alfred Bartholomäus Friedrich Anton Franz Eduard Joachim Anna Maria Schnee Oswald Hubertus von Khevenhüller-Metsch
- Born: 5 August 1919; Heiligenberg, Baden-Württemberg, Germany
- Died: 24 March 2010 (aged 90); St. Georgen am Längsee, Austria
- Noble family: Khevenhüller-Metsch
- Spouse: Countess Wilhelmine Henckel von Donnersmarck (m. 1956; died 2010)
- Issue: Johannes, 10th Prince of Khevenhüller-Metsch; Bartolomäus, 11th Prince of Khevenhüller-Metsch; Count Karl von Khevenhüller-Metsch; Count Georg von Khevenhüller-Metsch; Countess Melanie Waldburg-zu Wolfegg-und Waldsee; Countess Isabel Hartig
- Father: Franz, 8th Prince of Khevenhüller-Metsch
- Mother: Princess Anna von Fürstenberg

Maximilian Alfred Bartholomäus von Khevenhüller-Metsch (Note: His full name was Maximilian Alfred Bartholomäus Friedrich Anton Franz Eduard Joachim Anna Maria Schnee Oswald Hubertus von Khevenhüller-Metsch.) (5 August 1919 – 24 March 2010), hereditary 9th Prince of Khevenhüller-Metsch, was an Austrian nobleman.

== Early life ==
Khevenhüller-Metsch was born on 5 August 1919 at Schloss Heiligenberg in Heiligenberg, Baden-Württemberg, Germany, the home of his maternal grandparents. He was the son of Franz, 8th Prince of Khevenhüller-Metsch (1889–1977), and Princess Anna von Fürstenberg (1894–1928). Among his siblings were Countess Irma "Sunny" von Khevenhüller-Metsch (who married Silvio Scherz), Countess Melanie von Khevenhüller-Metsch (who married Count Peter Drašković de Trakošćan), and Countess Helene "Hella" von Khevenhüller-Metsch (who married Prince Konstantin of Bavaria and, after his death, Prince Eugen of Bavaria).

His paternal grandparents were Count Alfred von Khevenhüller-Metsch and Countess Melanie Ernesztina Erdõdy de Monyorókerék et Monoszló. His maternal grandparents were Maximilian Egon II, Prince of Fürstenberg and the former Countess Irma von Schönborn-Buchheim.

== Career ==
Upon the death of his father on 31 October 1977, he became the hereditary 9th Prince of Khevenhüller-Metsch (German: Fürst von Khevenhüller-Metsch). The Princely (Fürsten) title had been granted in 1763. (Note: The Khevenhüller family was mediatised in 1806, thereafter, belonging to high nobility before the German monarchies were abolished in 1918.)

== Personal life ==
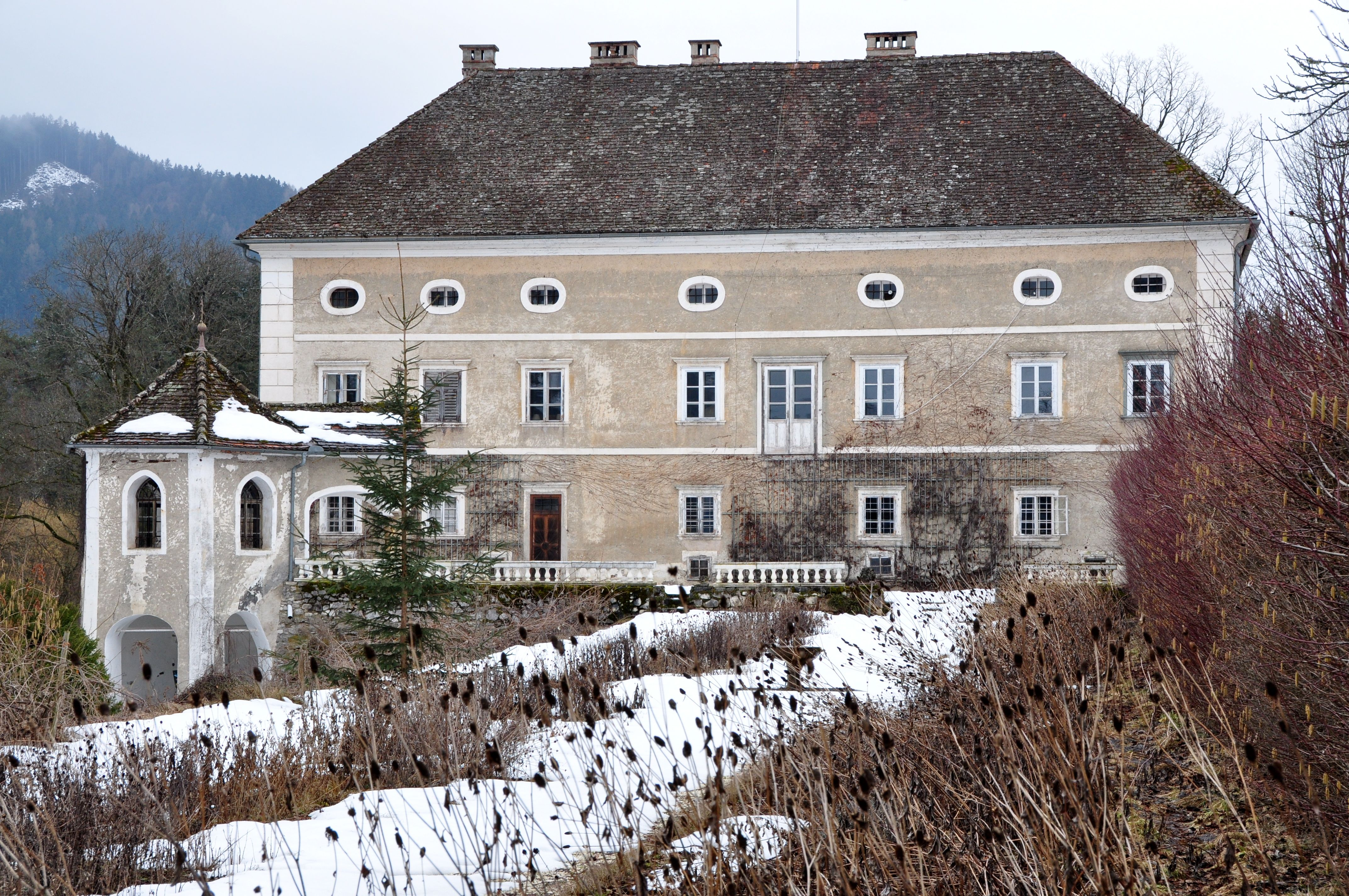
Schloss Niederosterwitz, St. Georgen am Längsee

On 19 January 1956 in Munich, the Prince of Khevenhüller-Metsch married Countess Wilhelmine Henckel von Donnersmarck, third child and second daughter of Count Lazarus Henckel von Donnersmarck and Countess Franziska von und zu Eltz. Wilhelmine's older brother, Count Karl Josef Henckel von Donnersmarck, was married to Princess Marie Adelaide of Luxembourg. Together, they lived in Lugano, Italy, and in Madrid, before moving to Schloss Niederosterwitz in Austria, which had been in his family since 1690. They were the parents of six children, all born in Madrid, including:

- Johannes von Khevenhüller-Metsch (1956–2020), who married Doña Camilla Borghese dei Principi di Nettuno, a daughter of Don Giovanni-Angelo Borghese dei Principi di Nettuno and Doña Lydia dei Conti Cremisini, in 1986.
- Maria Bartholomäus Lazarus Maximilian Hubertus von Khevenhüller-Metsch (b. 1958), who married Doña Cristina Sanchez de Movellán y Garcia Ogara, second daughter of Don Manuel Sánchez de Movellán Hupfel, Marqués de Movellán, in 1988.
- Count Maria Karl Maximilian Georg Hubertus Maximilian von Khevenhüller-Metsch (b. 1959), who married Lelia Gailly de Taurines, in 1992.
- Count Georg Christoph Henirich Hubertus von Khevenhüller-Metsch (b. 1960), who married Countess Stephanie zu Castell-Castell, daughter of Albrecht, 3rd Prince of Castell-Castell, and Princess Marie Luise of Waldeck and Pyrmont, in 1993.
- Countess Maria Melanie Anna Teresa von Khevenhüller-Metsch (b. 1967), who married Count Hubertus von Waldburg-zu Wolfegg-und Waldsee, son of Count Ludwig Karl von Waldburg zu Wolfegg und Waldsee and Princess Stephanie von Schönburg-Waldenburg, in 1993.
- Countess Maria Isabel Francisca Caroline von Khevenhüller-Metsch (b. 1972), who married Count Florian von Hartig, the son of Count Friedrich Ludwig Karl Josef Maria von Hartig, in 2004.

The Prince of Khevenhüller-Metsch died on 24 March 2010 at Schloss Niederosterwitz, St. Georgen am Längsee, Austria. He was succeeded by his eldest son, Johannes. As his eldest son died without male issue in 2020, the title passed to the 9th Prince's second son, Bartholomäus.
