= Josef Schulz (architect) =

Czech architect and university educator

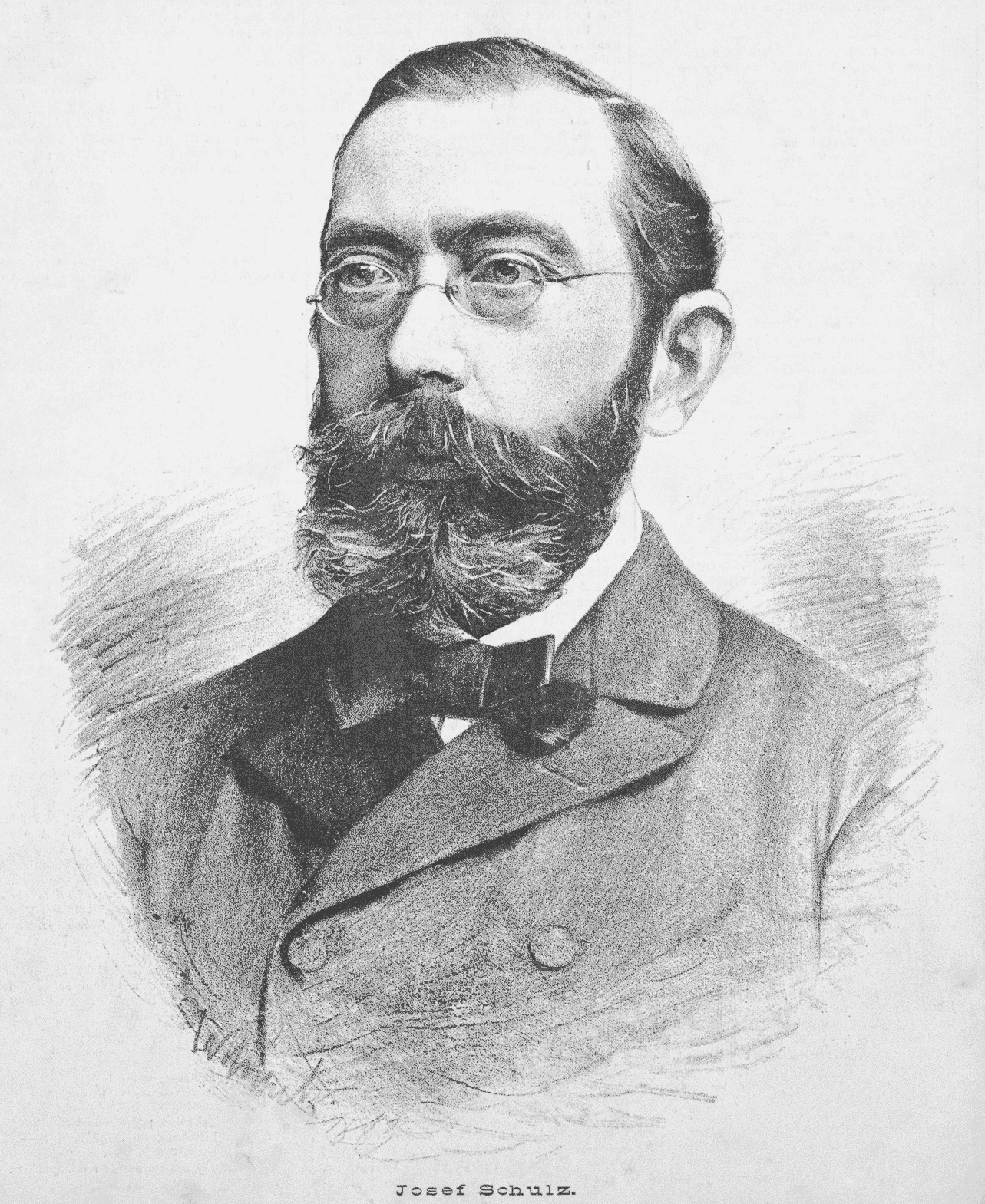
Josef Schulz; portrait by Jan Vilímek (1883)

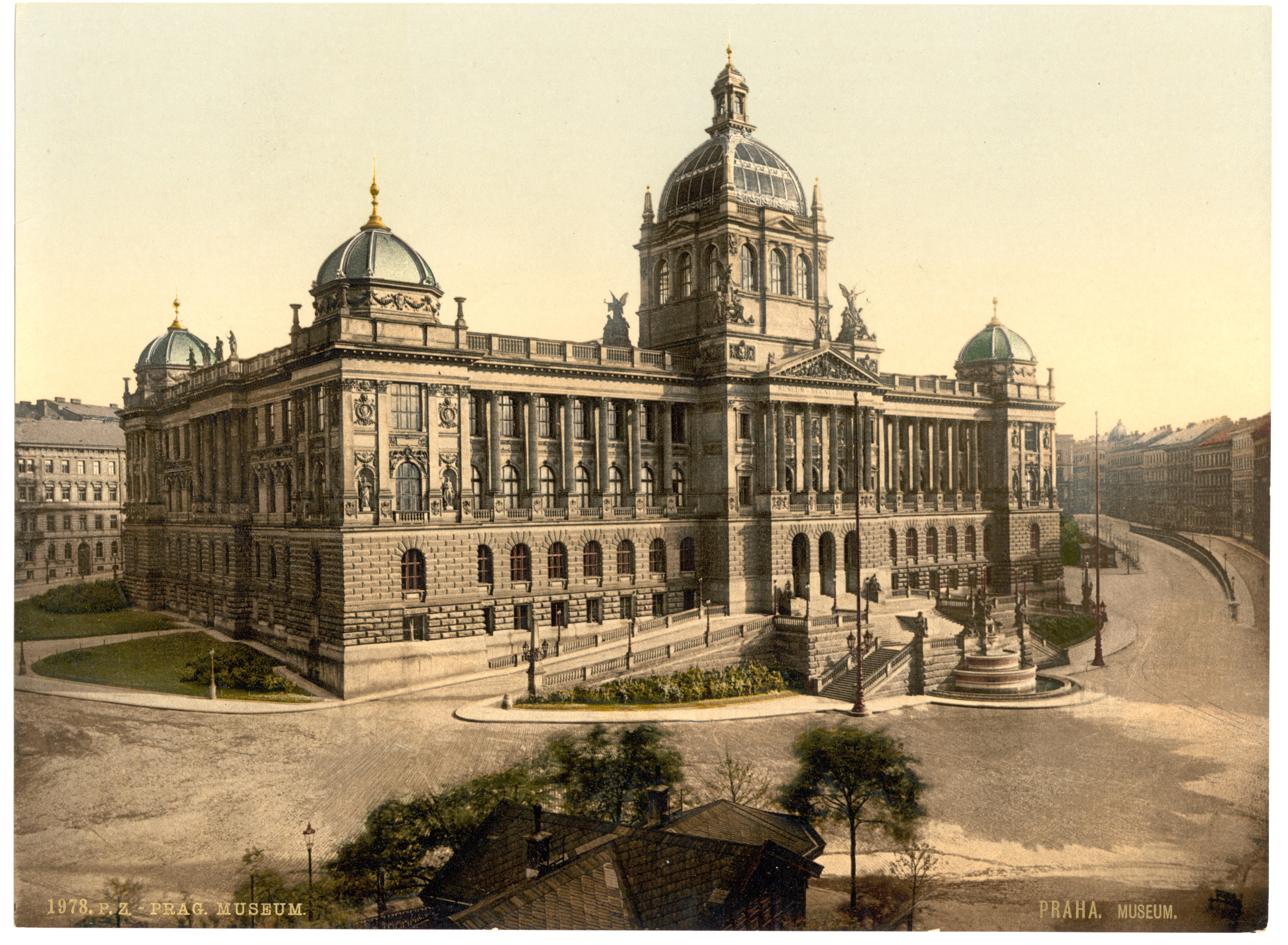
The National Museum in 1891

Josef Schulz (11 April 1840 – 15 July 1917) was a Czech architect, designer, teacher and restorer.

== Life and work ==
Schulz was born on 11 April 1840 in Prague. His father, Jan Schulz, was a wealthy merchant, originally from Hrdlív. He began studying architecture at Prague Polytechnic (1857–1861), then transferred to the Academy of Fine Arts, Vienna, where he worked in the studios of Eduard van der Nüll and August Sicard von Sicardsburg; graduating in 1865. He also served as an assistant to the architect, Josef Zítek, from 1864 to 1868. He completed his studies with a two-year trip to Italy, from 1868 to 1870.

After returning to Prague in 1871, he worked as an independent architect and invested in real estate; becoming the co-owner of several homes. His own home was in Old Town. He was completely devoted to his work and kept his widowed sister, Antonia, as his housekeeper.

In 1874, he began teaching at the Vocational School, creating designs for jewelry and haberdashery, which were then produced by his students. In 1878, he was appointed a full Professor at the Polytechnic and became a member of the Royal Bohemian Society of Sciences. Some of his lectures were published as articles in professional journals, such as Architektonický obzor.

His architectural designs included decorative elements, as well as furniture, lighting, and other interior equipment. Often, he would collaborate with the sculptor, Bohuslav Schnirch, for external decorations. From 1881 to 1883, he oversaw the restoration of the National Theatre, which had been heavily damaged by a fire a few months after it opened. Together with his former teacher, Zítek, he worked on the design and construction of the Rudolfinum, which opened in 1885. Later, he was the sole designer for the National Museum, built from 1885 to 1891, and the Museum of Decorative Arts, built from 1898 to 1901.

He also participated in the restoration of over a dozen buildings; including the Schwarzenberg Palace and the Wallenstein Palace in Prague, as well as castles of Stránov and Vrchlabí, and churches in Uherské Hradiště and Horní Maršov.

In 1911, the Czech Technical University (formerly the Polytechnic) awarded him the honorary title, Doctor of Technical Sciences.

He died on 15 July 1917 in Špindlerův Mlýn.

== Sources ==
- Karel B. Mádl: "Josef Schulz" (obituary) in: Národní listy, August 1917
- Anděla Horová (Ed.), Nová encyklopedie českého výtvarného umění, Vol. II. N–Ž, Academia Praha 1993, p. 740 ISBN 80-200-0522-6
- Ferdinand Seibt, Hans Lemberg, Helmut Slapnicka: Biographisches Lexikon zur Geschichte der böhmischen Länder, Collegium Carolinum, Vol. III, R. Oldenbourg Verlag, 2000, p. 787 ISBN 3-486-55973-7
- Constantin von Wurzbach: "Schulz, Joseph Bernhard." In: Biographisches Lexikon des Kaiserthums Oesterreich (Biographical Lexicon of the Empire of Austria). Part 32 Kaiserlich-königliche Hof- und Staatsdruckerei, Vienna 1876, p. 203 (digitalised).
- D. Klein: "Schulz Josef". In: Österreichisches Biographisches Lexikon 1815–1950 (ÖBL). Vol. 11, Austrian Academy of Sciences, Vienna 1999, ISBN 3-7001-2803-7, p. 347 f. (Direct links to "p. 347", "p. 348")
