= George Khevenhüller =

Carinthian nobleman

Georg von Khevenhüller
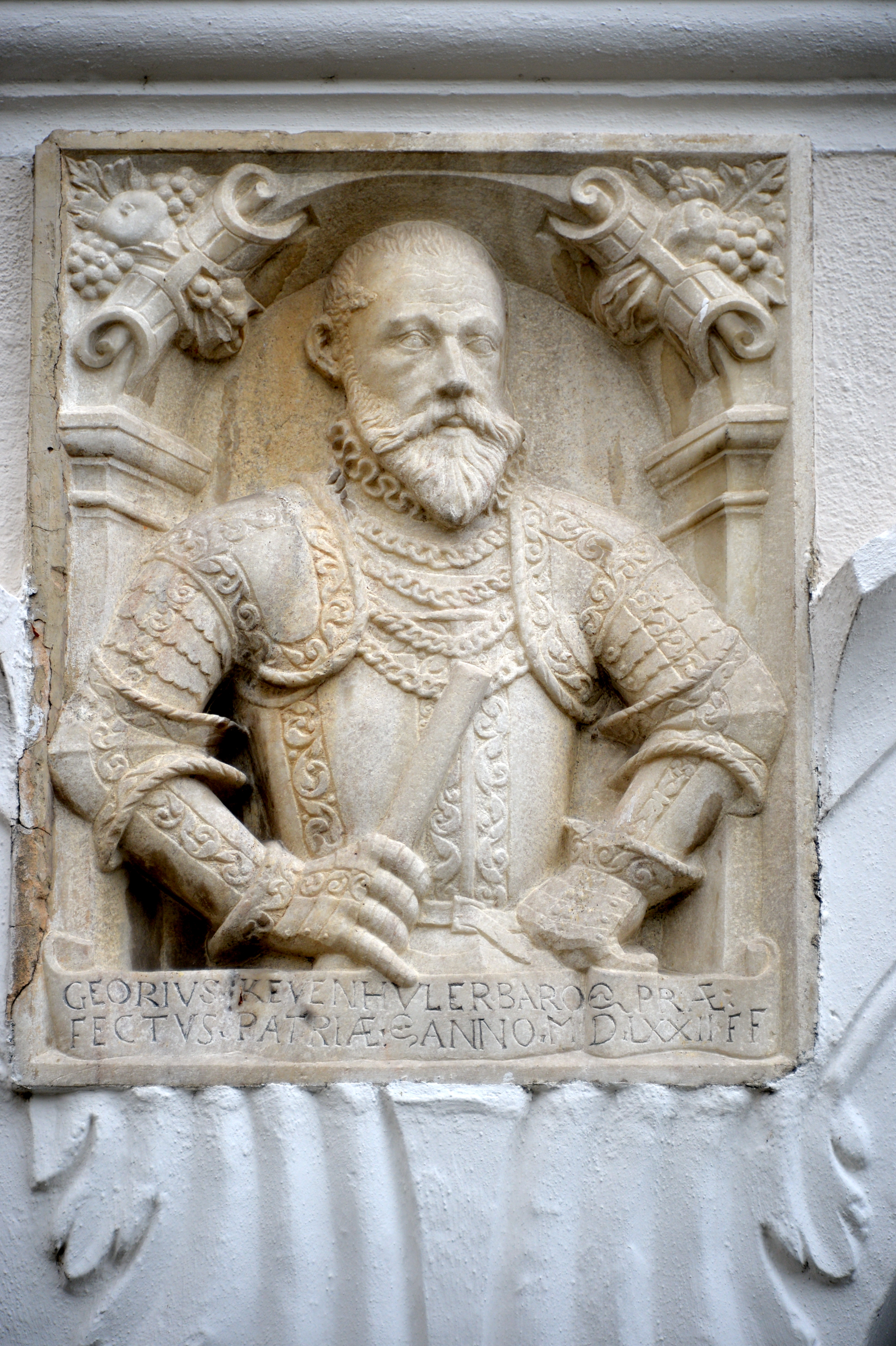
- Relief, Wernberg Castle
- Born: 22 April 1533; Pittersberg Castle, Kötschach, Carinthia
- Died: 9 September 1587 (aged 54); Klagenfurt, Carinthia
- Buried: Saint Jacob's Church, Villach
- Noble family: Khevenhüller
- Spouses: Sibylla Weitmoser; Anna von Thurzo
- Issue: Franz Christoph von Khevenhüller; Maria von Khevenhuller

Georg von Khevenhüller (Croatian pronunciation: [juraj kevenxiler], also spelled as Gjuro or George Khevenhiller; 22 April 1533 – 9 September 1587) was a Carinthian nobleman of the Khevenhüller dynasty. Though a dedicated Protestant by faith, he served as a governor of the Catholic House of Habsburg for several decades. He is also famous for building the city-fortress of Karlovac in Croatia.

== Life ==
The son of Sigmund Khevenhüller and nephew of the Carinthian governor (Landeshauptmann) Christoph von Khevenhüller (1503–1557), young George became a councillor at the court of the Habsburg emperor Ferdinand I and his successor Maximilian II. In 1565 he was appointed governor of Carinthia, later also President of the Inner Austrian Court Chamber at Graz and Court Chamberlain of Archduke Charles II of Austria. He distinguished himself as an officer in the Ottoman–Habsburg wars in the Kingdom of Croatia. On 21 August 1578, Khevenhiller and Ban Krsto Ungnad went from Slunj to Bihać.

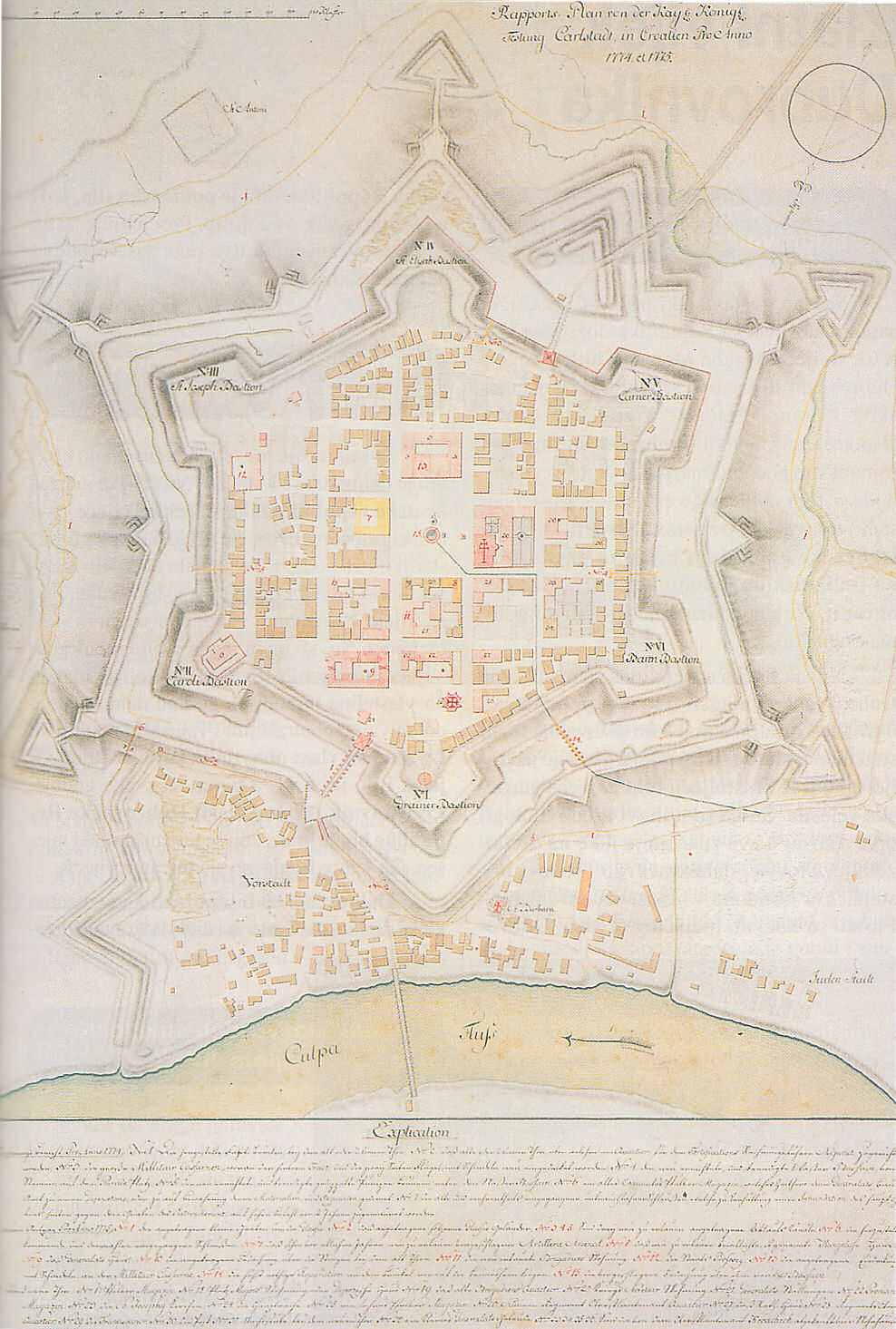
Karlovac fortress, 18th century map

In Croatia, Khevenhüller is remembered as a very cruel man. From 1579 onwards, he had the City of Karlovac (Karlstadt), named in honour of Archduke Charles II, built in order to strengthen the Habsburg southern defences against Ottoman encroaches. The establishment of the new city was a part of the deal between the Protestant nobility of Inner Austria and the archduke: in exchange for their religious freedom the nobles agreed to finance the building of a new fortress against the Ottoman Empire. The six-pointed star fortress was built on the Zrinski estate near the old town of Dubovac at the confluence of the Kupa and Korana rivers, on terrain exposed to flooding and disease from unhealthy water, with the intent to hamper the Turkish advance. Khevenhüller supervised work; he had gathered numerous serfs and forced them to build the new fortress. The Croatian writer Miroslav Krleža (1893–1981) wrote a poem named after him as part of his Ballads of Petrica Kerempuh, published in 1936.

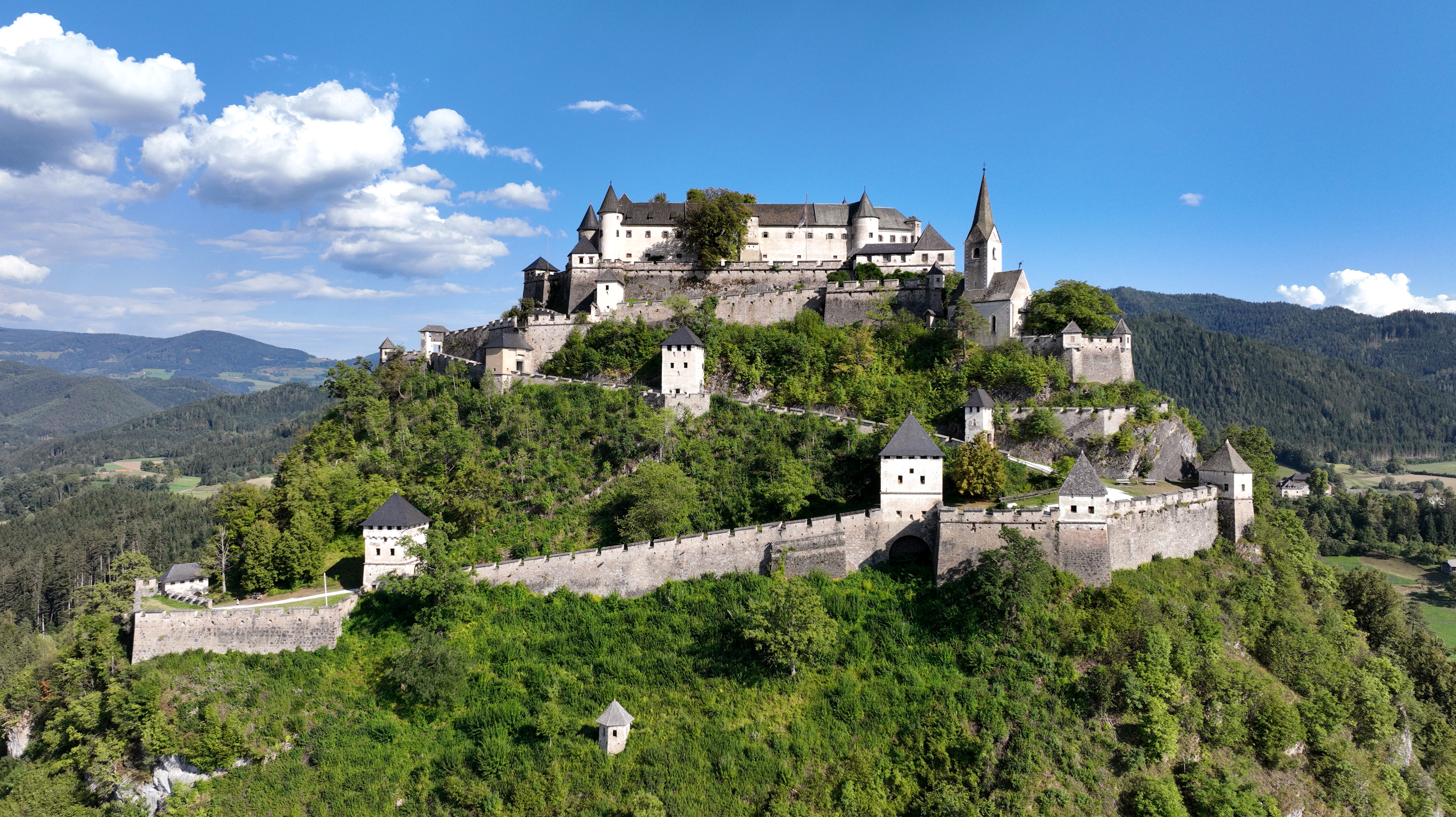
Hochosterwitz Castle

In his later years, Khevenhüller again took his residence in Carinthia. By his two marriages, he could provide substantial financial resources to acquire the castles of Hochosterwitz and Wernberg by purchase; he had both rebuilt in a lavish Renaissance style. In 1582 he had Annabichl Castle erected as a residence for his second wife Anna von Thurzo. He also supervised the redevelopment of Klagenfurt as the new Carinthian capital and had a city palace built in Villach about 1570, which however was destroyed in World War II.

Georg von Khevenhüller died in Klagenfurt; he is buried in the Saint Jacob's parish church of Villach alongside his uncle Christoph von Khevenhüller.

== Family ==
George was a son of Katharina von Gleinitz zu Glenstätten and her husband Sigismund III Khevenhüller.

He had two wives, Sibylla Weitmoser and Anna von Thurzo.

His sister was Salome von Khevenhüller.

== See also ==
- Landskron Castle (Carinthia)
