= Horní Maršov =

- Municipality
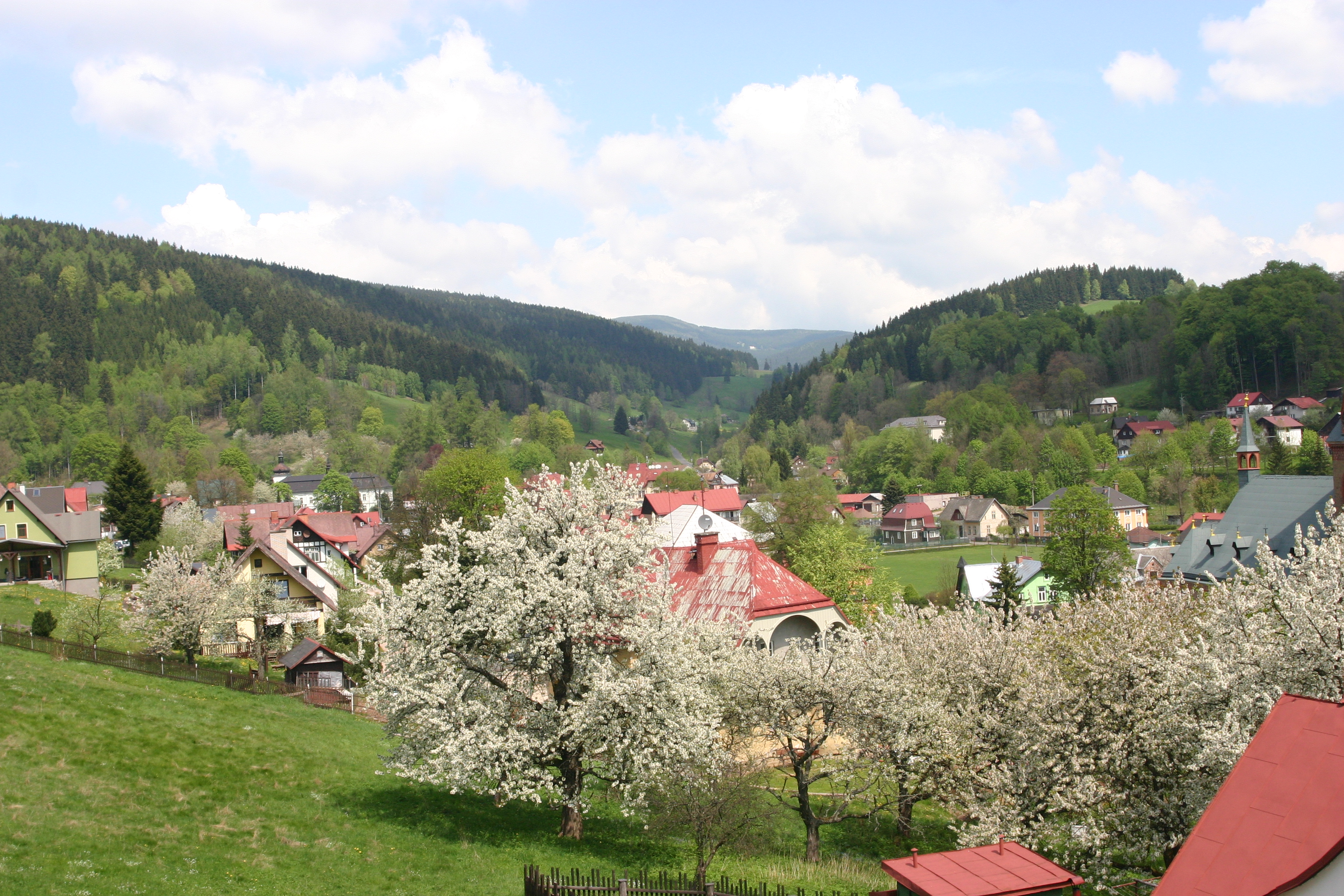
- General view

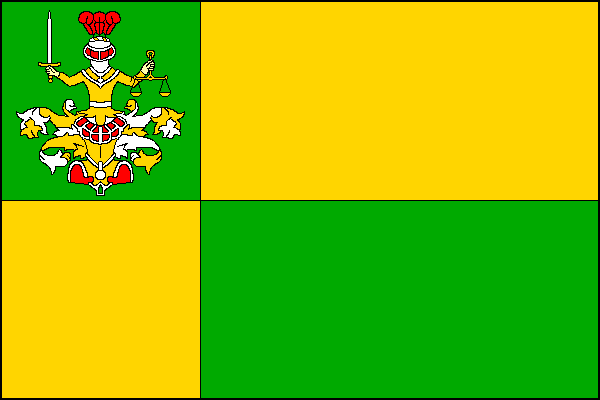
- Flag Coat of arms

- Location in the Czech Republic
- Coordinates: 50°39′31″N 15°49′11″E
- Country: Czech Republic
- Region: Hradec Králové
- District: Trutnov
- First mentioned: 1541

Area
  - Total: 28.47 km^{2} (10.99 sq mi)
- Elevation: 575 m (1,886 ft)

Population (2026-01-01)
  - Total: 934
  - Density: 32.8/km^{2} (85.0/sq mi)
- Time zone: UTC+1 (CET)
  - Summer (DST): UTC+2 (CEST)
- Postal code: 542 26
- Website: hornimarsov.cz

Horní Maršov (German: Marschendorf) is a municipality and village in Trutnov District in the Hradec Králové Region of the Czech Republic. It has about 900 inhabitants. It lies in the Giant Mountains.

== Administrative division ==
Horní Maršov consists of six municipal parts (in brackets population according to the 2021 census):

- Horní Maršov (736)
- Dolní Albeřice (26)
- Dolní Lysečiny (39)
- Horní Albeřice (4)
- Horní Lysečiny (4)
- Temný Důl (117)

== Etymology ==
Both the Czech name Maršov and the German name Marschendorf means "Marš's/Marsch's village". The prefix horní means 'upper'.

== Geography ==
Horní Maršov is located about 11 kilometres (7 mi) northwest of Trutnov and 49 km (30 mi) north of Hradec Králové, on the border with Poland. It lies in the Giant Mountains. The highest point is at 550 m (1,804 ft) above sea level. Most of the municipal territory lies in the Krkonoše National Park. The Úpa River flows through the municipality.

== History ==
The first written mention of Maršov is from 1541. A wooden church in Maršov was first documented in 1565. The division of the village into Horní Maršov and Dolní Maršov (which is today an integral part of Svoboda nad Úpou) first appeared in 1654.

During the German occupation of Czechoslovakia in World War II, the Germans established and operated the E584 forced labour subcamp of the Stalag VIII-B/344 prisoner-of-war camp in the village.

== Demographics ==
Historical population

Year	Pop.	±%
1869	2,668	—
1880	3,052	+14.4%
1890	2,688	−11.9%
1900	2,680	−0.3%
1910	2,520	−6.0%

Year	Pop.	±%
1921	2,392	−5.1%
1930	2,475	+3.5%
1950	1,355	−45.3%
1961	1,142	−15.7%
1970	1,034	−9.5%

Year	Pop.	±%
1980	959	−7.3%
1991	1,028	+7.2%
2001	1,058	+2.9%
2011	1,041	−1.6%
2021	926	−11.0%

Source: Censuses

== Transport ==
There are no railways or major roads passing through the municipality.

== Sights ==
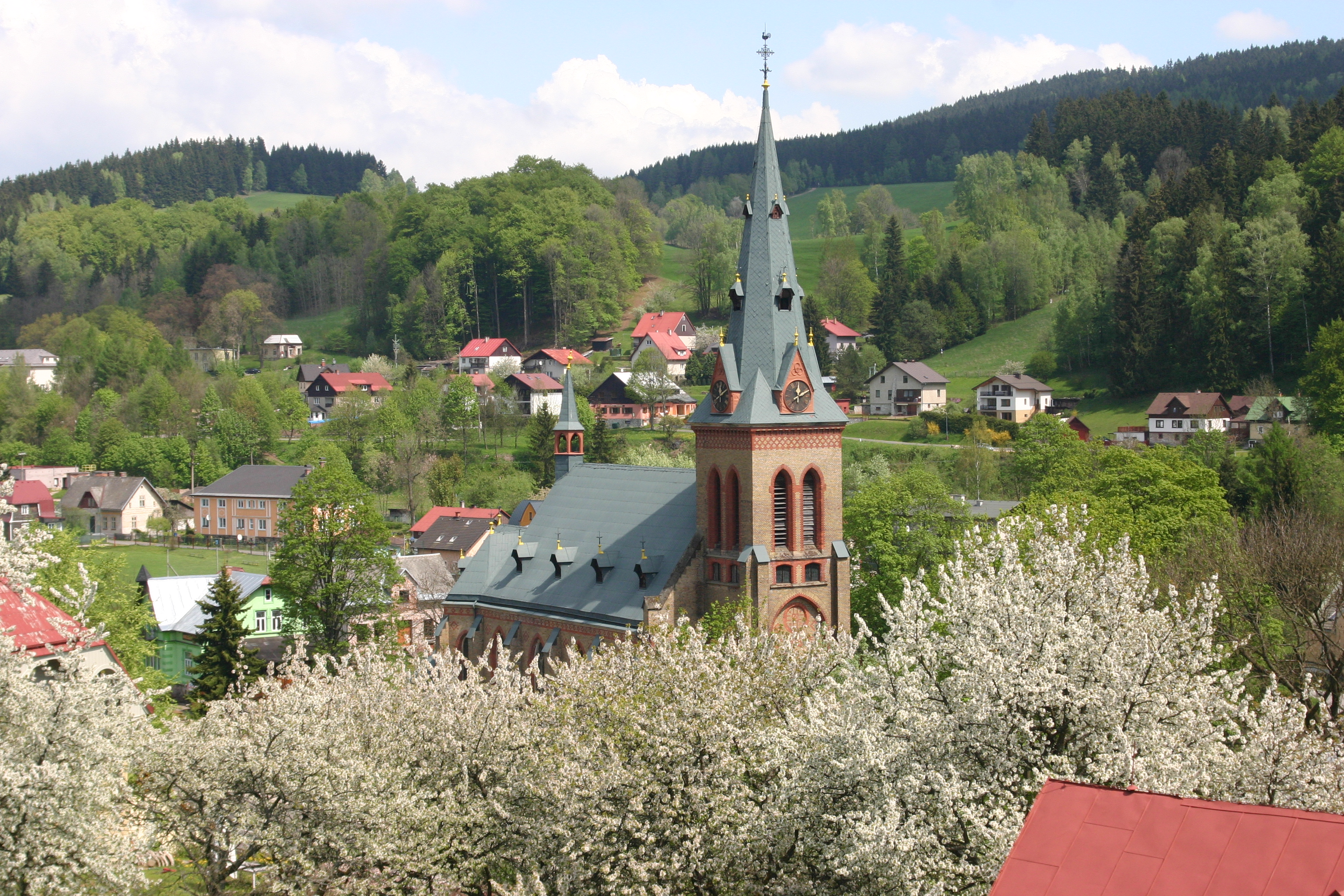
Church of the Assumption of the Virgin Mary

The main landmark of Horní Maršov is the Church of the Assumption of the Virgin Mary. It was built by Josef Schulz in the neo-Gothic style in 1895–1899.

The Horní Maršov Castle belongs to the most valuable buildings of the village. It was built in the late Baroque style in 1792. In 1869, it was rebuilt in the Neo-Renaissance style and the tower was added.

== Notable people ==
- Hermann Clemens Kosel (1867–1945), Austrian writer and artist
