= Hochosterwitz Castle =

Historic building in Austria

Coordinates: 46°45′18″N 14°27′13″E

Hochosterwitz
- Sankt Georgen, Carinthia, Austria
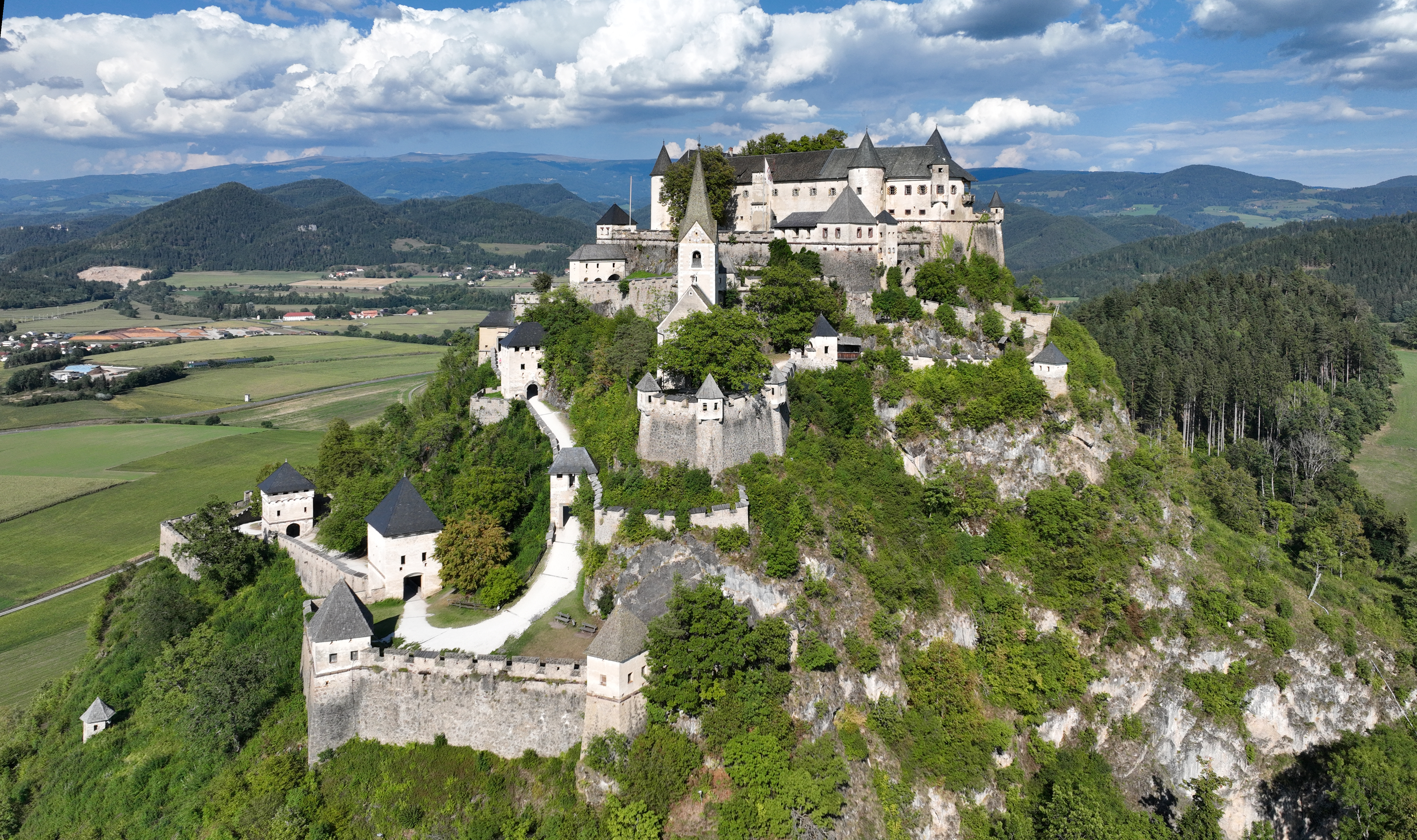
- West view of Hochosterwitz Castle

Site information
- Type: Rock castle
- Owner: Khevenhüller noble family
- Open to the public: April–October
- Condition: restored

Location
- Height: 664m.

Site history
- Built: c. 860 (1166 years ago)
- Built by: Osterwitz dynasty

Hochosterwitz Castle (German: Burg Hochosterwitz, Slovene: Grad Ostrovica) is a castle in Austria, considered one of Austria's most impressive medieval castles. It is on a 172-metre-high (564 ft) dolomite rock near Sankt Georgen am Längsee, east of the town of Sankt Veit an der Glan in Carinthia. The rock castle is one of the state's landmarks and a major tourist attraction.

== Location ==
Hochosterwitz is 664 metres (2,178 ft) above sea level on the rim of the historic Zollfeld plain north of Magdalensberg, about 7 km (4.3 mi) east of Sankt Veit. It can be seen from a distance of up to 30 km (19 mi) on a clear day.

== History ==
A settlement site since the Bronze Age, the rock was first mentioned in an 860 deed issued by Louis the German, King of East Francia, donating several of his properties in the former principality of Carantania to the Archdiocese of Salzburg. It was then named Astarwiza. Celtic, Slavic, and Germanic origins have been suggested for the name. It remained a Salzburg possession, until in the 11th-century Archbishop Gebhard of Salzburg ceded the castle to the descendants of Count Siegfried of Sponheim in return for their support during the Investiture Controversy. After Siegfried's grandson Henry IV became Duke of Carinthia in 1122, the Sponheim rulers were able to shake off the Salzburg overlordship. Later they bestowed the fiefdom upon the ministeriales of the Osterwitz noble family, possibly a cadet branch of the Sponheim dynasty. In 1209, one Herman of Osterwitz, who held the hereditary office of the cup-bearer at the ducal court in Sankt Veit, accompanied Duke Bernhard of Carinthia to the coronation of Emperor Otto IV in Rome.

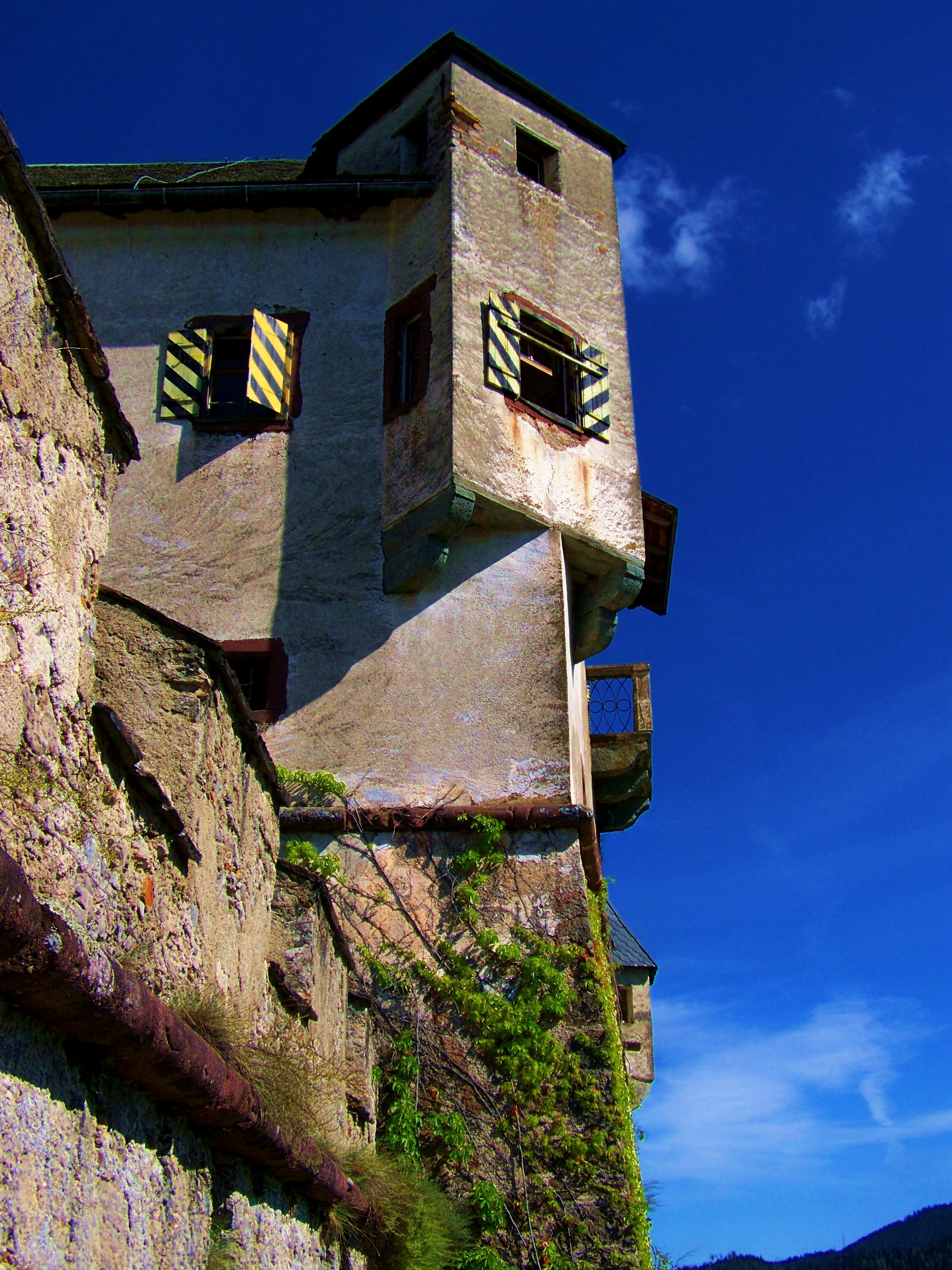
Fragment of the stronghold

In his book Change, the Austro-American psychologist Paul Watzlawick (1921–2007) tells a popular tale of the siege of the castle by the troops of Countess Margaret of Tyrol (Margarethe Maultasch). According to legend first noted by the medieval chronicler Jakob Unrest and later by Jacob Grimm, Margaret, cheated by the Austrian House of Habsburg of her inheritance claims to Carinthia upon her father's death in 1335, invaded the duchy; her forces were however deceived and withdrew when the garrison of Hochosterwitz slaughtered its last ox, filled it with grain, and threw it over the wall, pretending it still had so many provisions in stock that they could be used as projectiles. The tale is a common topic in the Eastern Alpine region, and it is known in many variations, with different characters.

In the 15th century, the last Carinthian cup-bearer, Georg of Osterwitz, was captured in a Turkish invasion and died in 1476 in prison without leaving descendants. Hans, cup-bearer of Osterwitz, was the last remaining survivor of the family. He owed a substantial debt to the Emperor and was forced to give up the deeds of the castle to pay his debt. So after four centuries, on 30 May 1478, the possession of the castle reverted to the Habsburg emperor Frederick III.

Over the next 30 years, the castle was badly damaged by numerous Turkish campaigns. On 5 October 1509, Emperor Maximilian I handed the castle as a pledge to Matthäus Lang von Wellenburg, then Bishop of Gurk. Bishop Lang undertook a substantial renovation project for the damaged castle.

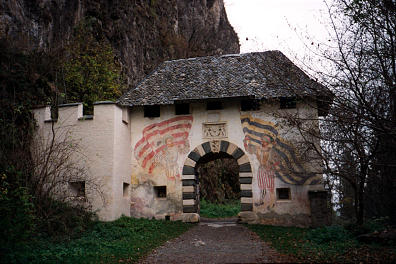
One of the 14 fortified gates

About 1541, German king Ferdinand I of Habsburg bestowed Hochosterwitz upon the Carinthian governor Christof Khevenhüller. In 1571, Baron George Khevenhüller acquired the citadel by purchase. He fortified to deal with the threat of Turkish invasions of the region, building an armory and 14 gates between 1570 and 1586. Such massive fortification is considered unique in citadel construction. Because of the 14 gates, each equipped with different treacherous methods of guarding the path, local legend maintains that the castle has never been conquered and that none of the attacks managed to get beyond the fourth (Engelstor) gate.

== Present ==
Since the 16th century, no major changes have been made to Hochosterwitz. It has also remained in the possession of the Khevenhüller family as requested by the original builder, George Khevenhüller. A marble plaque dating from 1576 in the castle yard documents this request.

Some parts of the castle are open to the public every year from Easter to the end of October. Tourists are allowed to walk the 620-metre-long (2,030 ft) pathway through the 14 gates up to the castle; each gate has a diagram of the defense mechanism used to seal that particular gate. The castle rooms hold a collection of prehistoric artifacts, paintings, weapons, and armor, including one set of armor 2.4 metres (8 ft) tall, once worn by Burghauptmann Schenk.

Hochosterwitz Castle can be reached by car or a hike from Launsdorf-Hochosterwitz train station, with connection to nearby Klagenfurt.

A 1:25 miniature scale model of Hochosterwitz Castle may be seen at Minimundus, a popular tourist attraction in Klagenfurt approximately 20 kilometres (12 mi) away.

== Gallery ==
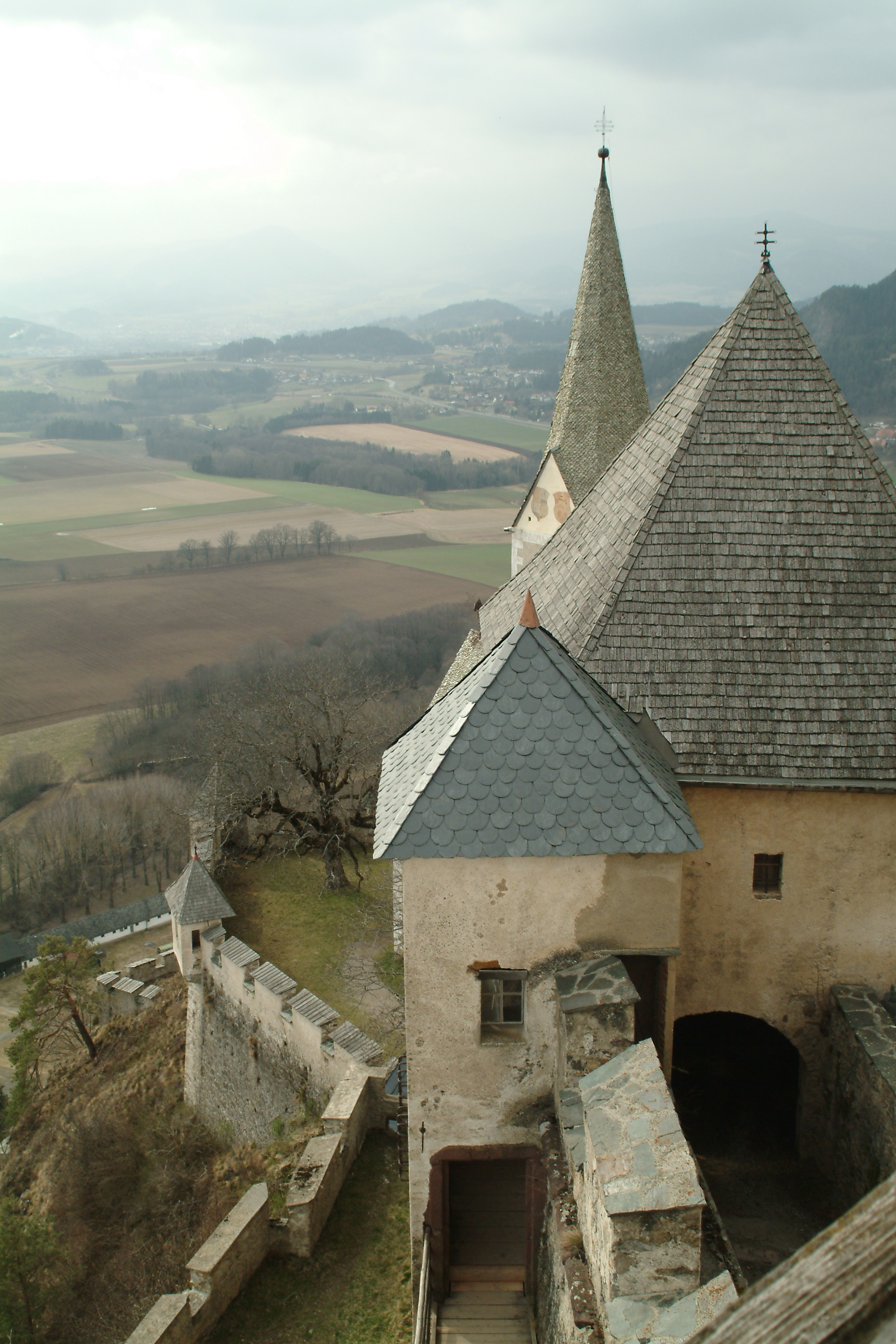
Looking northwest from the top of the castle

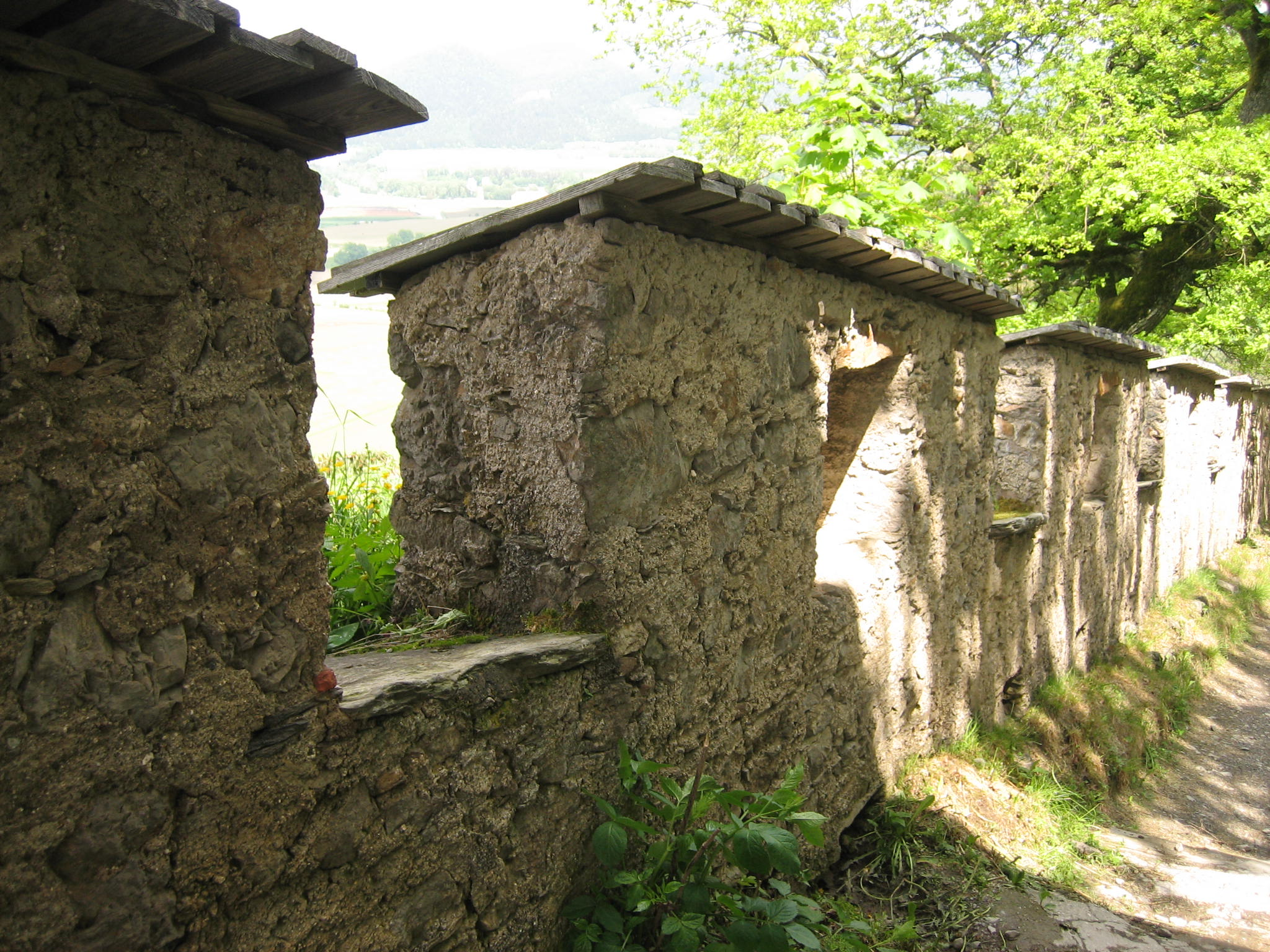
Battlements at the beginning of the path

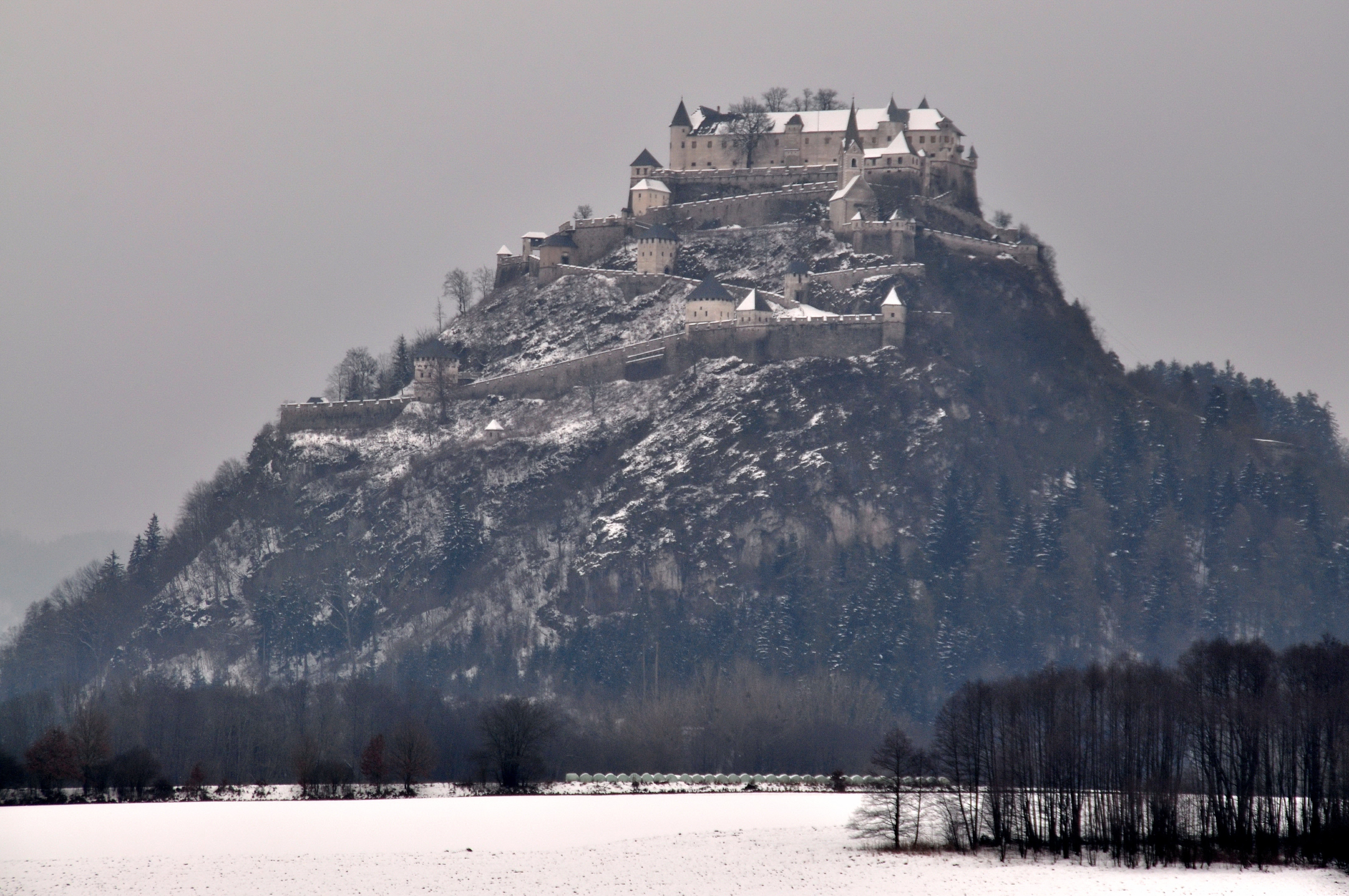
Hochosterwitz in winter

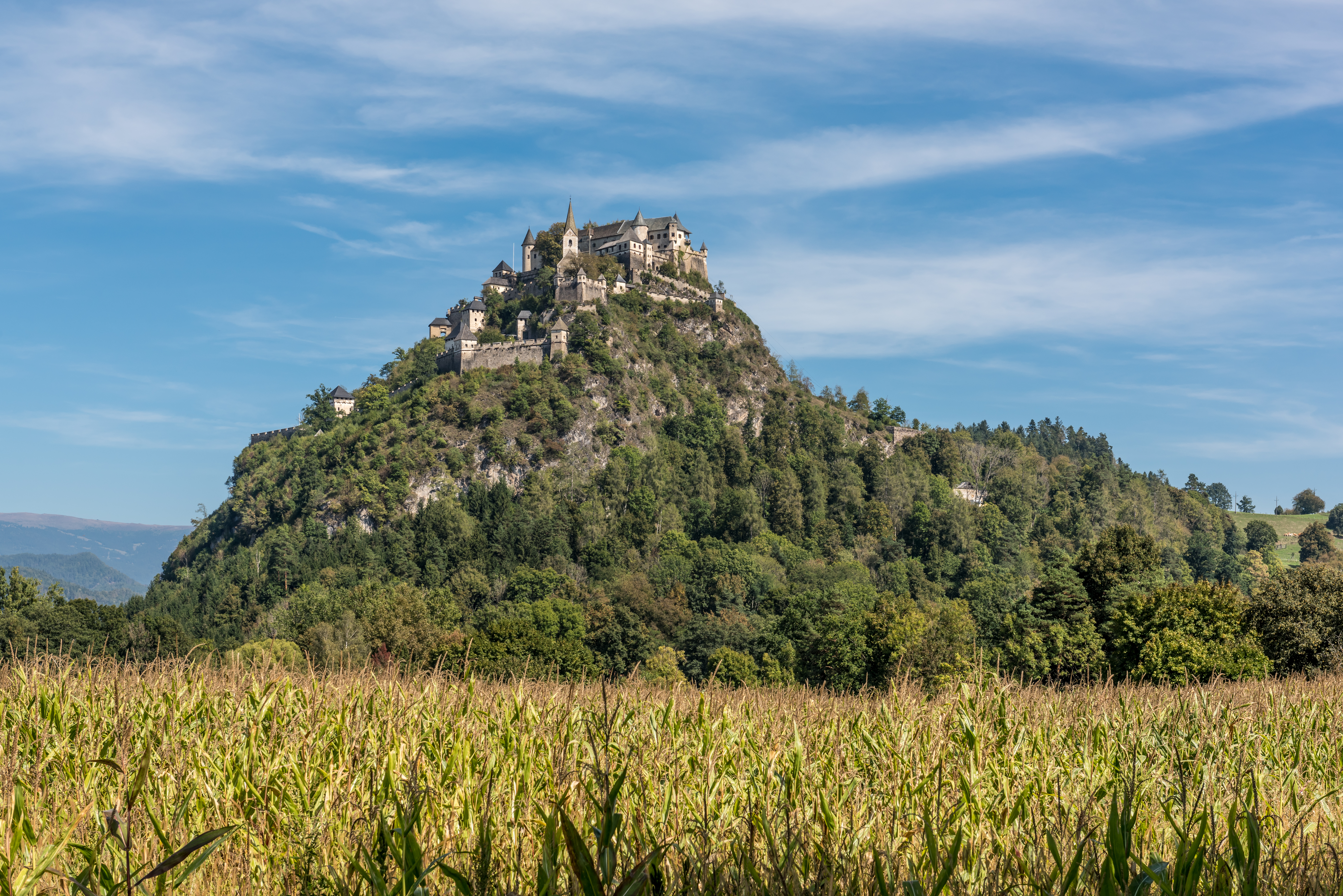
Hochosterwitz in summer

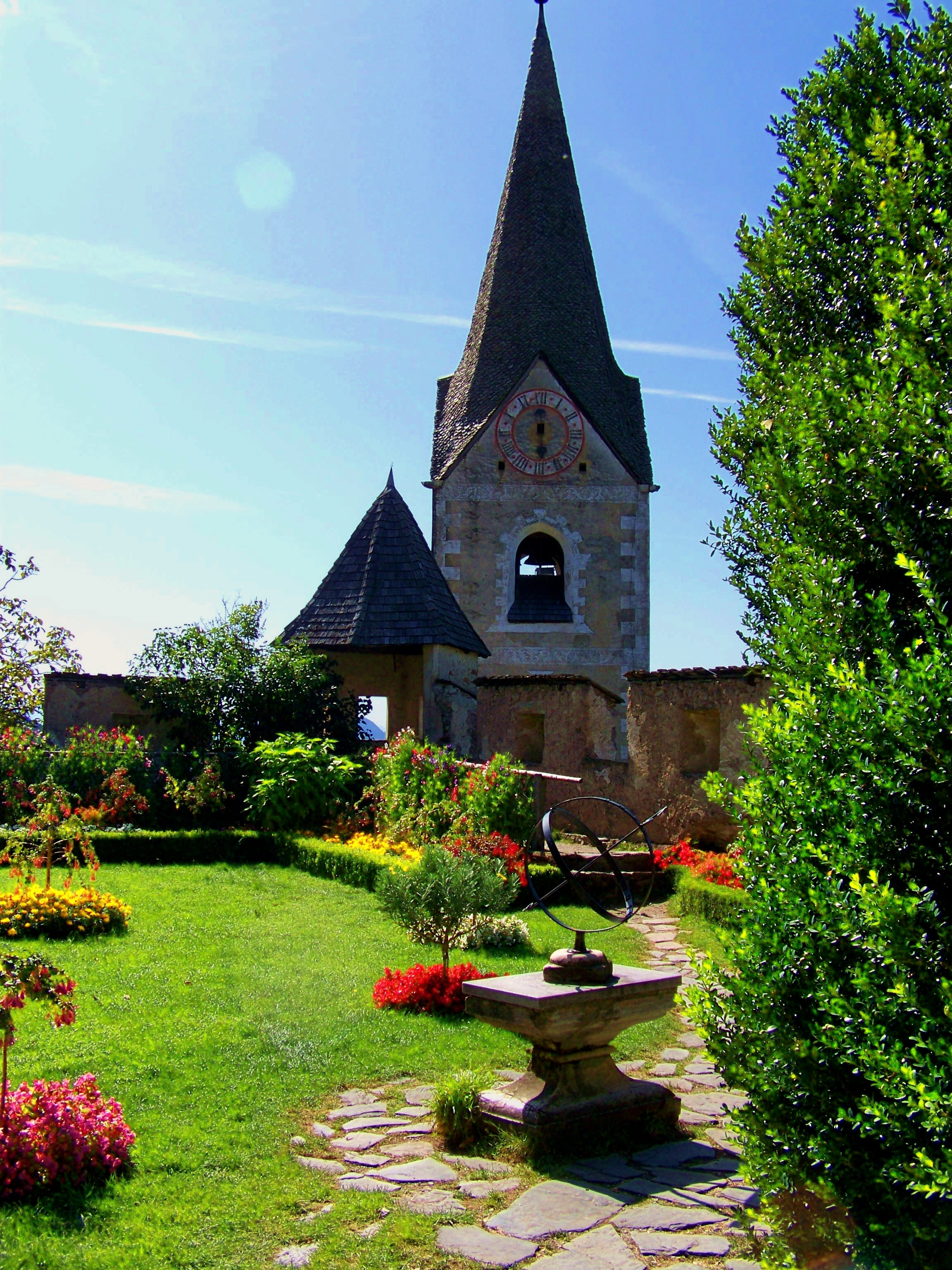
Castle garden, with church spire in background
