= Hermann Clemens Kosel =

Austrian writer, painter, graphic artist and photographer

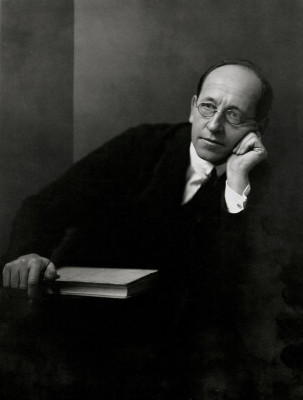
Self portrait by Kosel, 1910

Hermann Clemens Kosel (22 November 1867 – 14 September 1945) was an Austrian writer, painter, graphic artist and photographer.

== Early life ==
Kosel was born on 22 November 1867 in Dunkelthal, Bohemia, Austria-Hungary (today Temný Důl, a part of Horní Maršov in the Czech Republic). He grew up in Braunau (Broumov) and did an apprenticeship as a bookbinder with his father.

From 1889 to 1891 he attended the Graphic Education and Research Institute, Vienna.

== Career ==
Kosel began his career as a photographer as studio manager for the amateur photographer, Albert von Rothschild, between 1891 and 1905 and gave lessons in photographic techniques to wealthy amateurs. In 1905, he opened a rubber printing business and promoted this process for the Austrian manufacturer Langer. His portrait studio, which he opened in 1906, employed 23 people. Kosel won over a well-off Viennese clientele and was promoted to Court Photographer in 1911. From 1905 to 1909 he was editor of the magazine Photo-Sport.

Kosel was the editor of anthologies of contemporary literature and edited the literary journals Iduna, Deutsches Böhmerland, and Blätter für deutsche Dichtung from 1892 to 1903, among others. His own poetry was set to music several times. Kosel wrote mainly biographical novels. He also illustrated his books himself and painted landscapes and portraits.

Since his son, Hermann Kosel, who had a Jewish wife, Nelly Wengraf, had to flee to Aix-en-Provence from the Nazis after the annexation of Austria in 1938, he closed the studio in 1940 and sold the inventory.

== Personal life ==
Kosel died in Vienna on 14 September 1945 and was buried at the Vienna Central Cemetery.

== Gallery ==
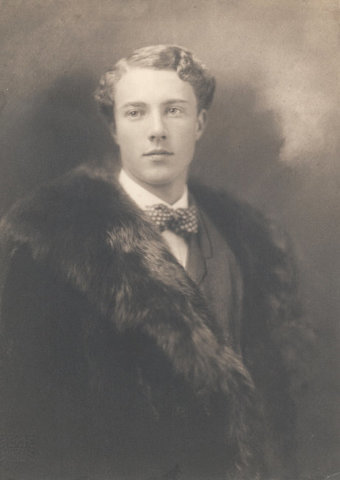
Prince Franz of Khevenhüller-Metsch, 1910

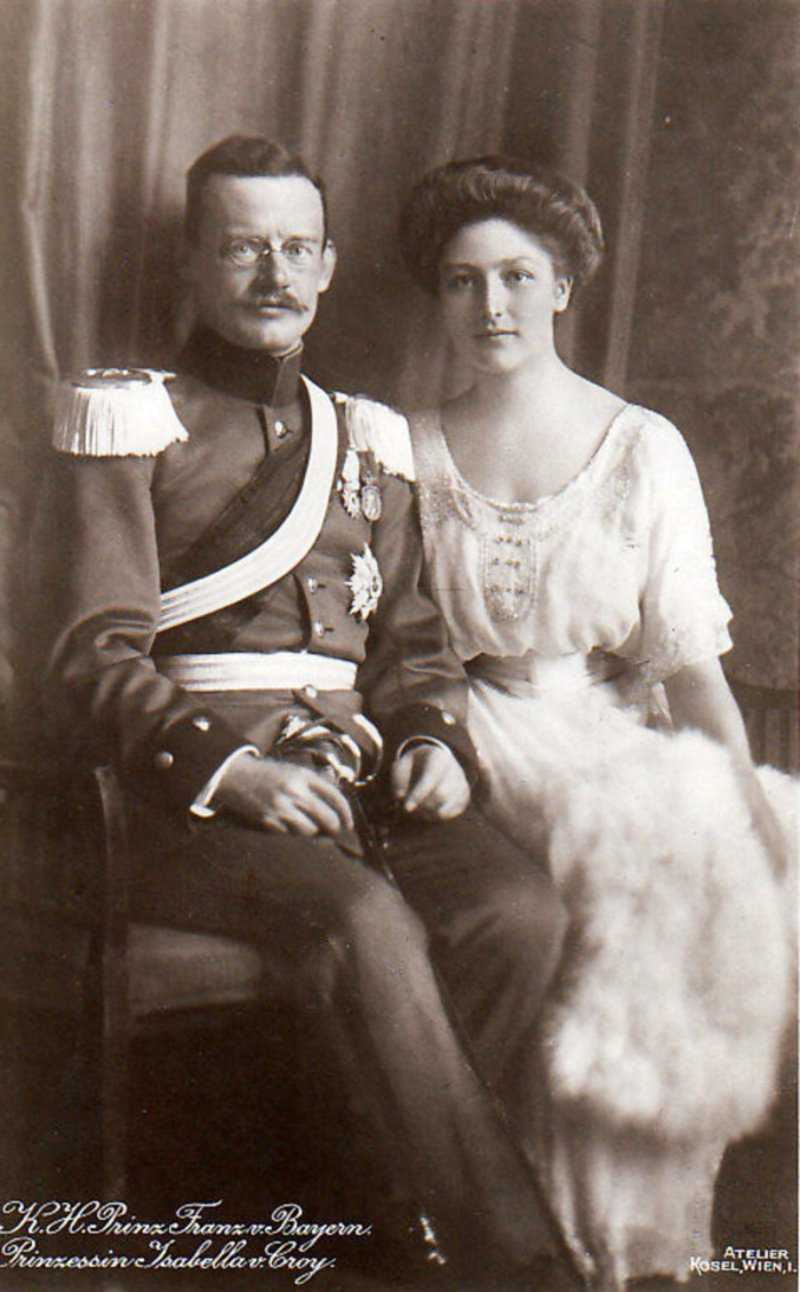
Princess Isabella Antonie of Croÿ and Prince Franz of Bavaria, c. 1912

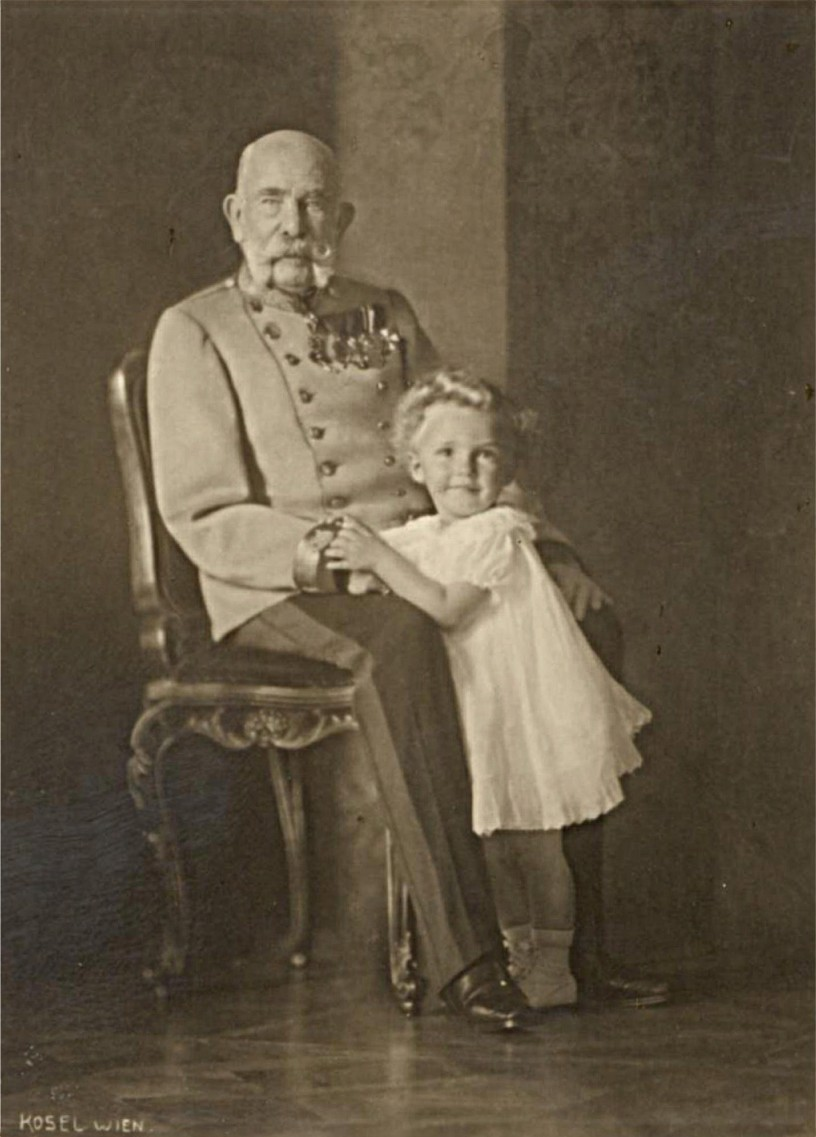
Emperor Franz Joseph I and Otto, 1914

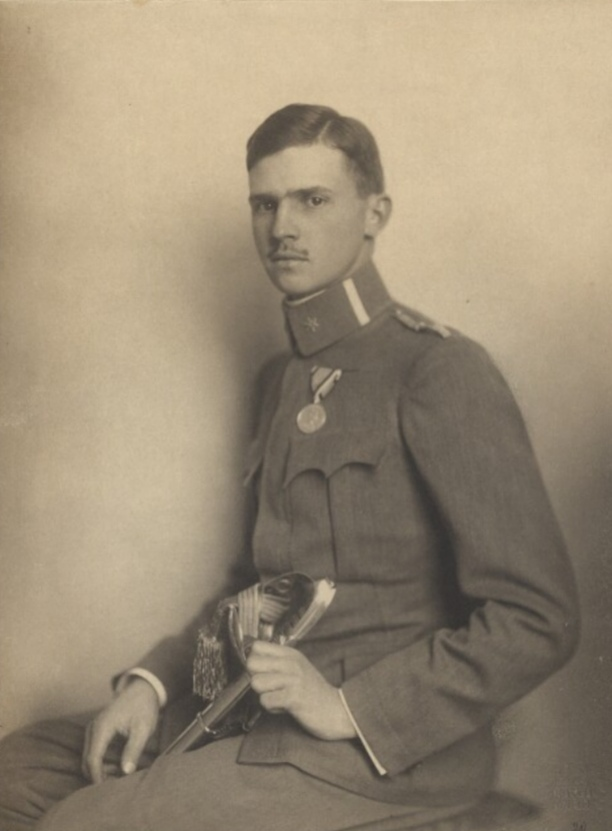
Prince Felix of Bourbon-Parma, 1916

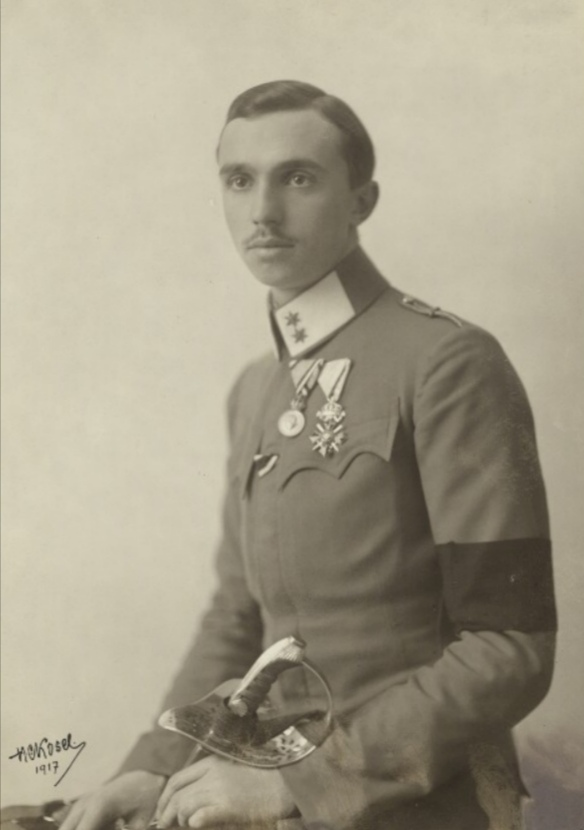
Prince René of Bourbon-Parma, 1917

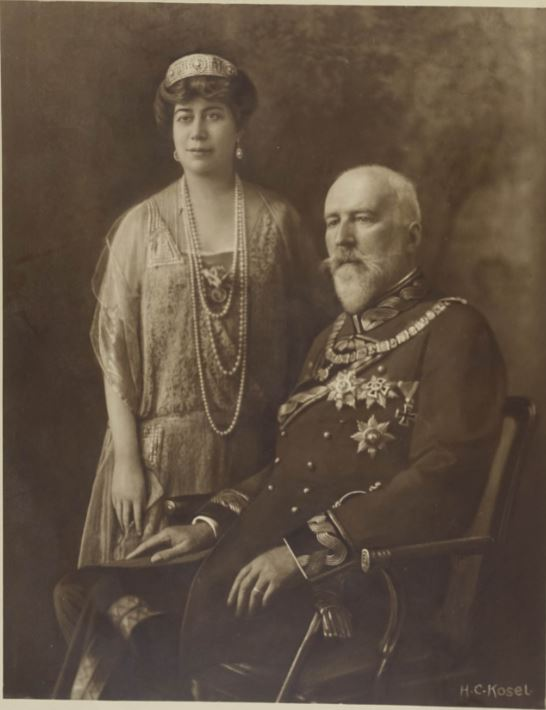
Prince Franz and Princess Elsa of Liechtenstein, 1935
