= Längsee (Kärnten) =

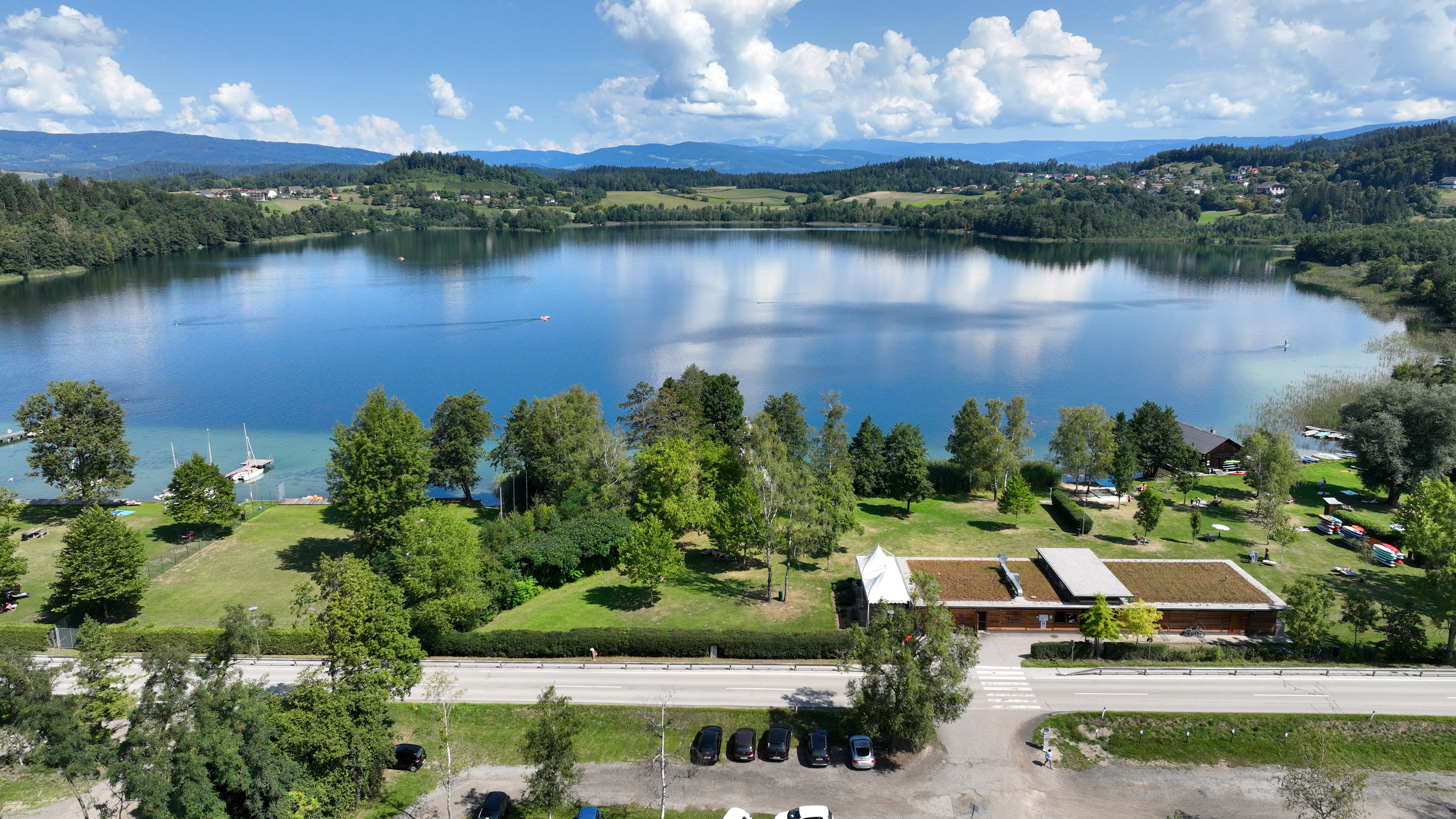
- South view of Längsee

- Location within Austria
- Location: Carinthia, Austria
- Coordinates: 46°47′22″N 14°25′27″E
- Type: lake

Längsee is a lake of Carinthia, Austria. It is the name affix of the town Sankt Georgen am Längsee. The lido, located at the Sankt Georgen am Längsee end, is open daily from 8 am to 7 pm from mid-May to mid-September, weather permitting.
