= Annabichl Castle =

Coordinates: 46°39′23″N 14°18′42″E

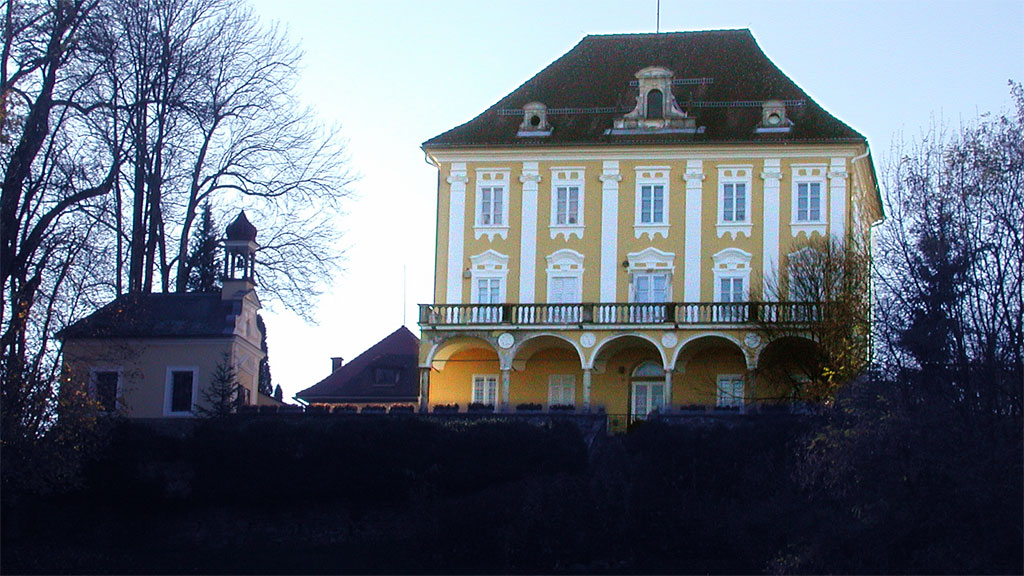
Annabichl Castle

Annabichl Castle is a castle in Austria. It was built by the nobleman George Khevenhüller for his second wife Anna von Thurzo. Their daughter was Maria von Khevenhuller.

The castle has a little chapel dedicated to Saint Anne and a garden.

Archduchess Maria Anna of Austria (1738–1789) was an owner of the castle for some time.
