= Ludwig von Lützow (politician) =

Mecklenburgian politician (1793–1872)

Ludwig von Lützow (1793 – 13 May 1872) was a Mecklenburgian politician.

== Early life ==
Lützow was born in 1793 in Berlin. He was the son of Mecklenburgian envoy August von Lützow.

== Career ==
Lützow entered the service of the Mecklenburg-Schwerin government in 1816 as a junior lawyer, and in 1822 became a government advisor (Regierungsrat). With the accession of Grand Duke Paul Friedrich, he became, on May 6, 1837, Second Minister and head of the regional government (Regierungspräsident), and, on July 6, 1840, First Minister and Geheimeratspräsident.

As First Minister, he led the 1848 transition of Mecklenburg-Schwerin to a constitutional system of government. A new constitution was published on October 10, 1849, creating a Department of State to handle foreign, religious, and educational affairs. He resigned on April 12, 1850 in protest at Grand Duke Friedrich Franz II's attempts to make the legal validity of the constitution dependent on the judgment of a special tribunal set up to arbitrate.

Following his resignation, von Lützow retired to his estate in Boddin.
