= Hrdlív =

- Municipality
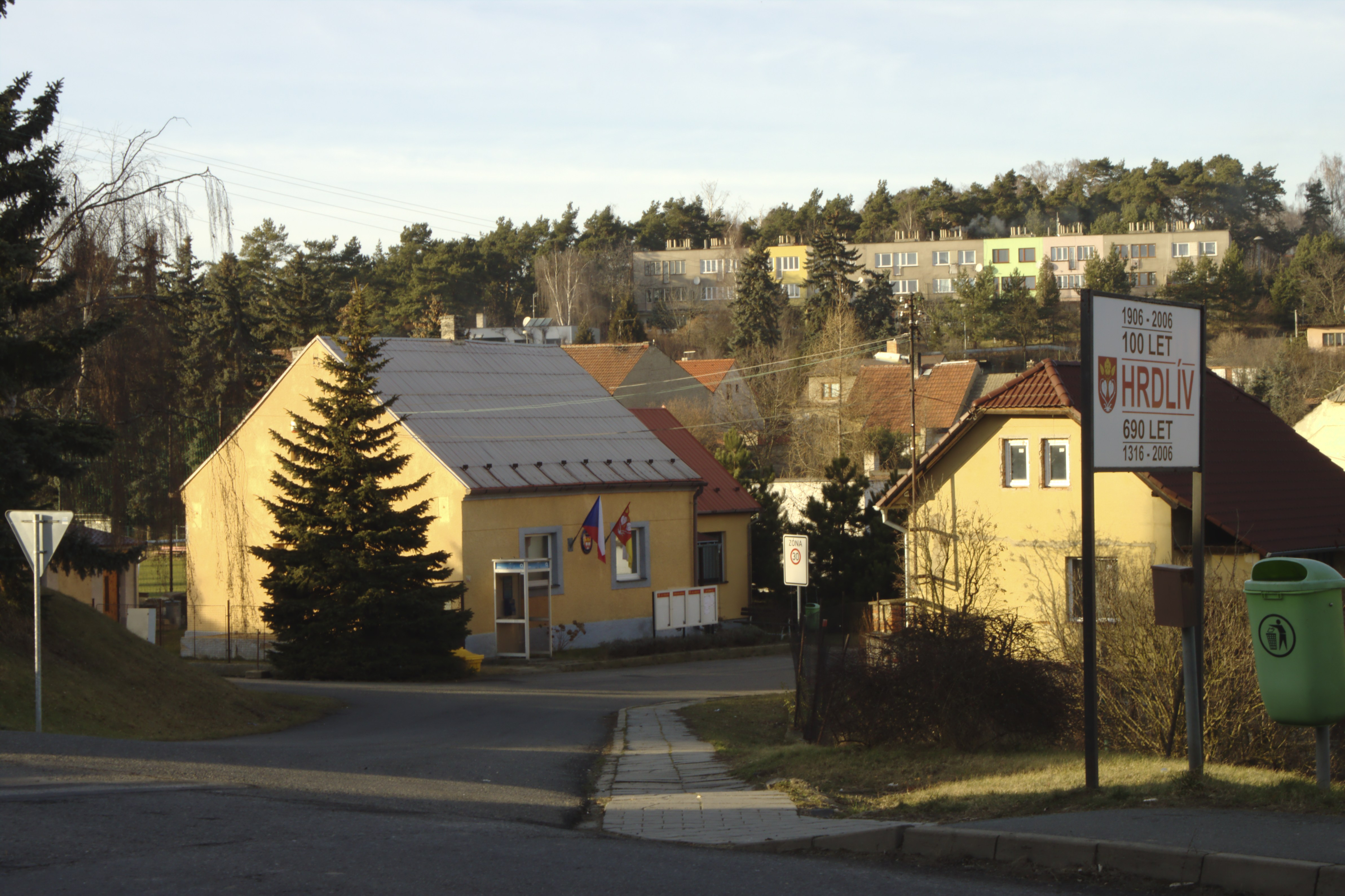
- Municipal office

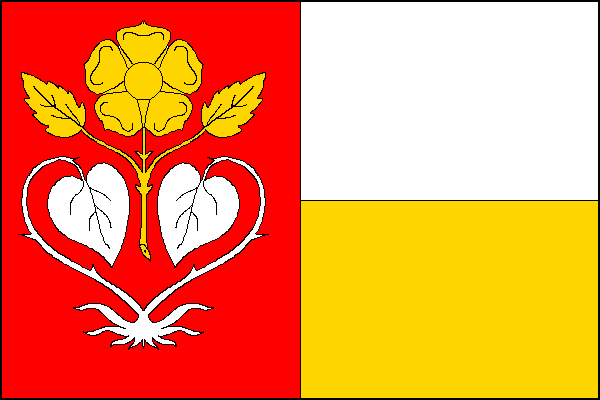
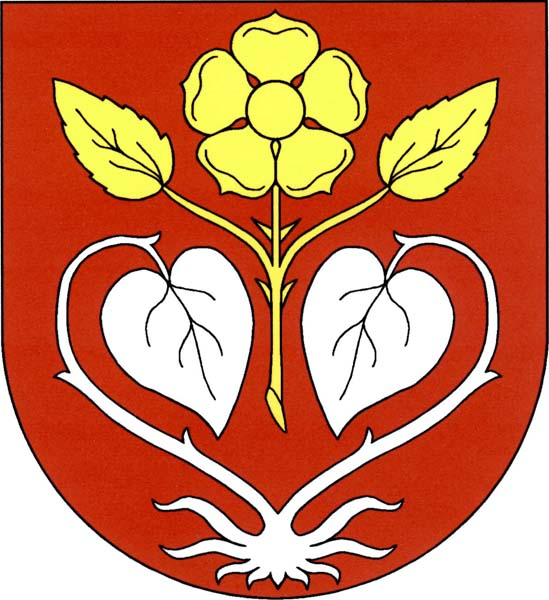
- Flag Coat of arms

- Location in the Czech Republic
- Coordinates: 50°11′58″N 14°4′21″E
- Country: Czech Republic
- Region: Central Bohemian
- District: Kladno
- First mentioned: 1316

Area
  - Total: 1.70 km^{2} (0.66 sq mi)
- Elevation: 285 m (935 ft)

Population (2026-01-01)
  - Total: 531
  - Density: 312/km^{2} (809/sq mi)
- Time zone: UTC+1 (CET)
  - Summer (DST): UTC+2 (CEST)
- Postal code: 273 06
- Website: www.hrdliv.cz

Hrdlív (pronounced [ˈɦr̩dliːf]) is a municipality and village in Kladno District in the Central Bohemian Region of the Czech Republic. It has about 500 inhabitants.

== Etymology ==
The name is derived from the personal name Hrdlej or Hrlej.

== Geography ==
Hrdlív is located about 6 kilometres (4 mi) north of Kladno and 23 km (14 mi) northwest of Prague. It lies in the Prague Plateau. The highest point is at 338 m (1,109 ft) above sea level.

== History ==
The first written mention of Hrdlív is from 1316. From the 15th century, Hrdlív was part of the Smečno estate, which belonged to the Martinic family (since 1792 Clam-Martinic). After the abolition of feudalism in 1848, Hrdlív became part of the Třebichovice municipality. In 1906, it became a separate municipality.

== Demographics ==
Historical population

Year	Pop.	±%
1869	94	—
1880	126	+34.0%
1890	168	+33.3%
1900	301	+79.2%
1910	342	+13.6%

Year	Pop.	±%
1921	337	−1.5%
1930	383	+13.6%
1950	385	+0.5%
1961	356	−7.5%
1970	354	−0.6%

Year	Pop.	±%
1980	398	+12.4%
1991	387	−2.8%
2001	392	+1.3%
2011	477	+21.7%
2021	516	+8.2%

Source: Censuses

== Transport ==
There are no railways or major roads passing through the municipality.

== Sights ==
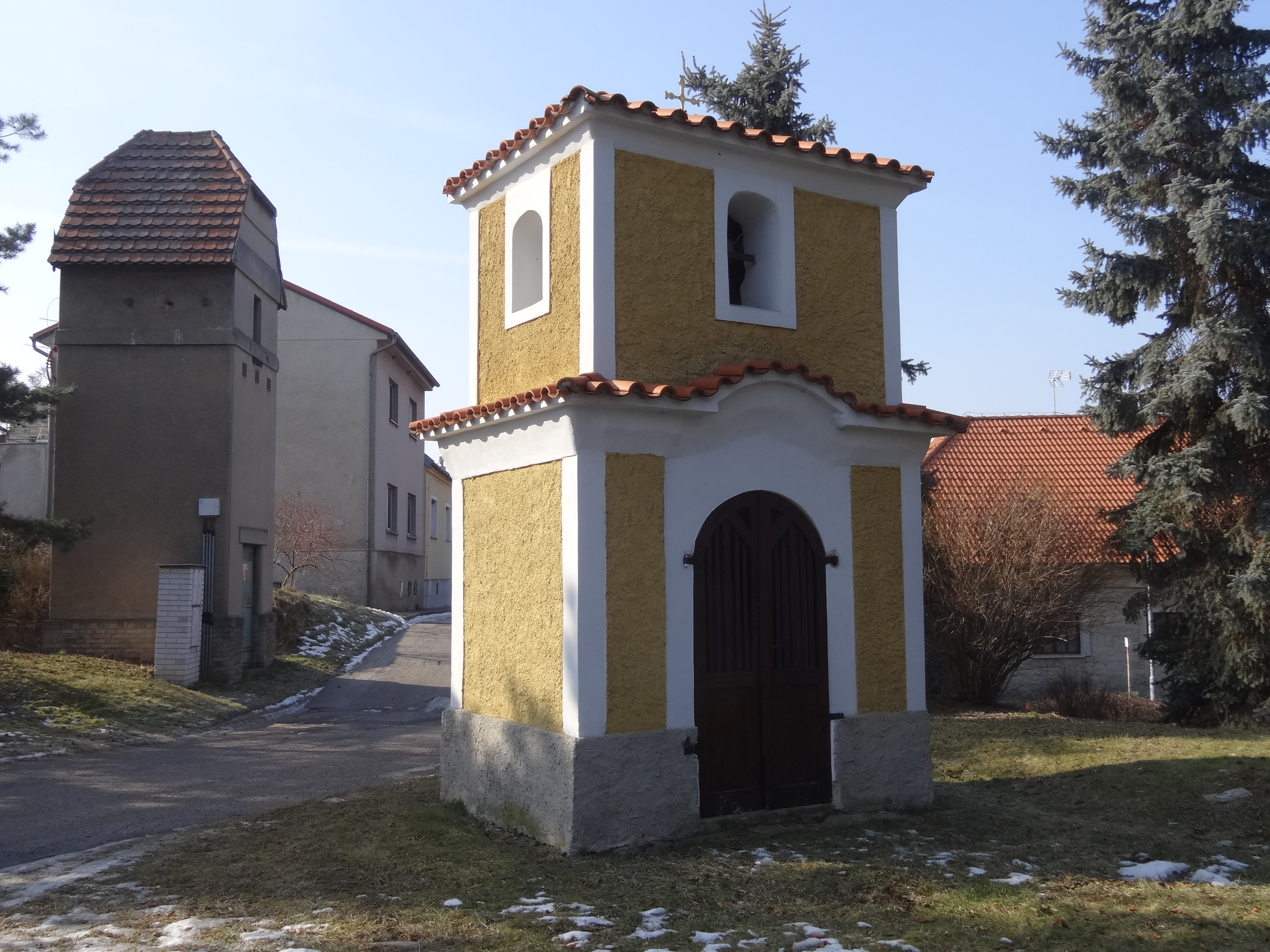
Chapel in the centre of Hrdlív

The only protected cultural monument in the municipality is a small Baroque chapel dating from 1745.
