= St. Georgen am Längsee =

- Municipality
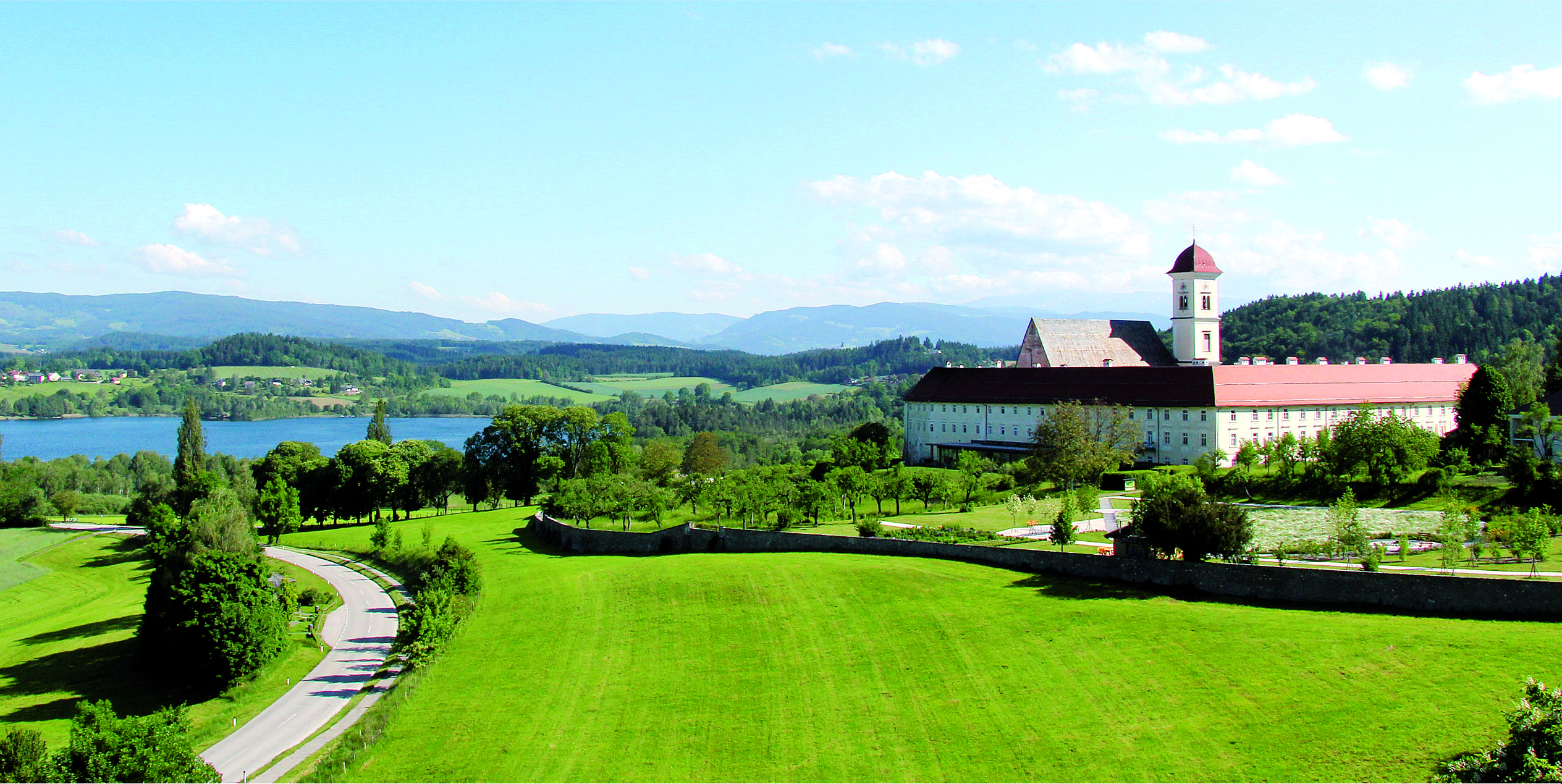
- Sankt Georgen Abbey

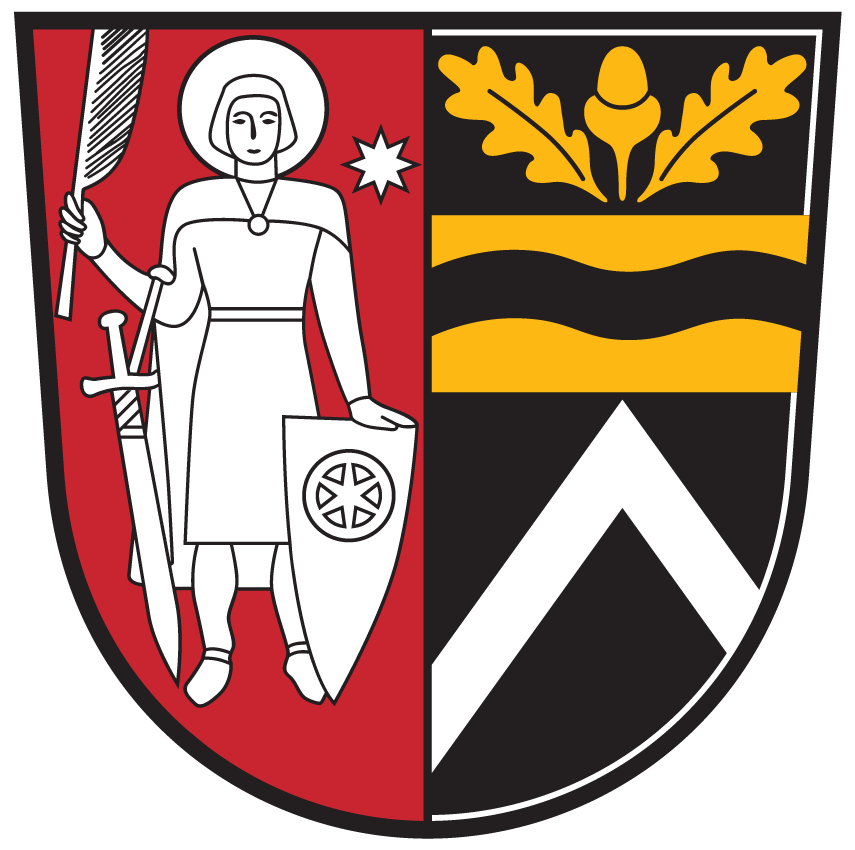
- Coat of arms

- Location within Austria St. Georgen am Längsee (Austria)
- Coordinates: 46°47′N 14°26′E
- Country: Austria
- State: Carinthia
- District: St. Veit an der Glan

Government
  - Mayor: Johann Wolfgang Grilz (FPÖ)

Area
  - Total: 69.81 km^{2} (26.95 sq mi)
- Elevation: 537 m (1,762 ft)

Population (2018-01-01)
  - Total: 3,648
  - Density: 52.26/km^{2} (135.3/sq mi)
- Time zone: UTC+1 (CET)
  - Summer (DST): UTC+2 (CEST)
- Postal code: 9330, 9313
- Area code: +43 4213
- Website: www.stgeorgen-laengsee.at

St. Georgen am Längsee (Slovene: Šentjurij ob Dolgem jezeru) is a municipality in the district of St. Veit an der Glan in Carinthia, Austria.

== Geography ==
St. Georgen is located at the Längsee north of the Zollfeld Valley. In the east, the Gurk River flows southwards into the Klagenfurt basin. The municipal area comprises the cadastral communities of Goggerwenig, Gösseling, Launsdorf, Osterwitz, and Taggenbrunn as well as famous Hochosterwitz Castle in the south.

== History ==
The settlement arose from the former St. Georgen monastery of Benedictine nuns established about 1002/08 by the local Countess Wichburg, a granddaughter of the Bavarian duke Eberhard. Rebuilt in a Baroque style, it was dissolved by order of Emperor Joseph II in 1783. Today the premises serve as a conference centre.

== Politics ==
The municipal council (Gemeinderat) is composed of 23 members and, following the 2021 Carinthian local elections, represents the following parties:

- Social Democratic Party of Austria (SPÖ): 10 seats
- Freedom Party of Austria (FPÖ): 7 seats
- Austrian People's Party (ÖVP): 6 seats

The mayor of St. Georgen am Längsee, Johann Wolfgang Grilz (FPÖ), was elected in 2021.

=== Twin towns — sister cities ===
St. Georgen is twinned with:

- Zoppola, Italy
