= Rifflsee =

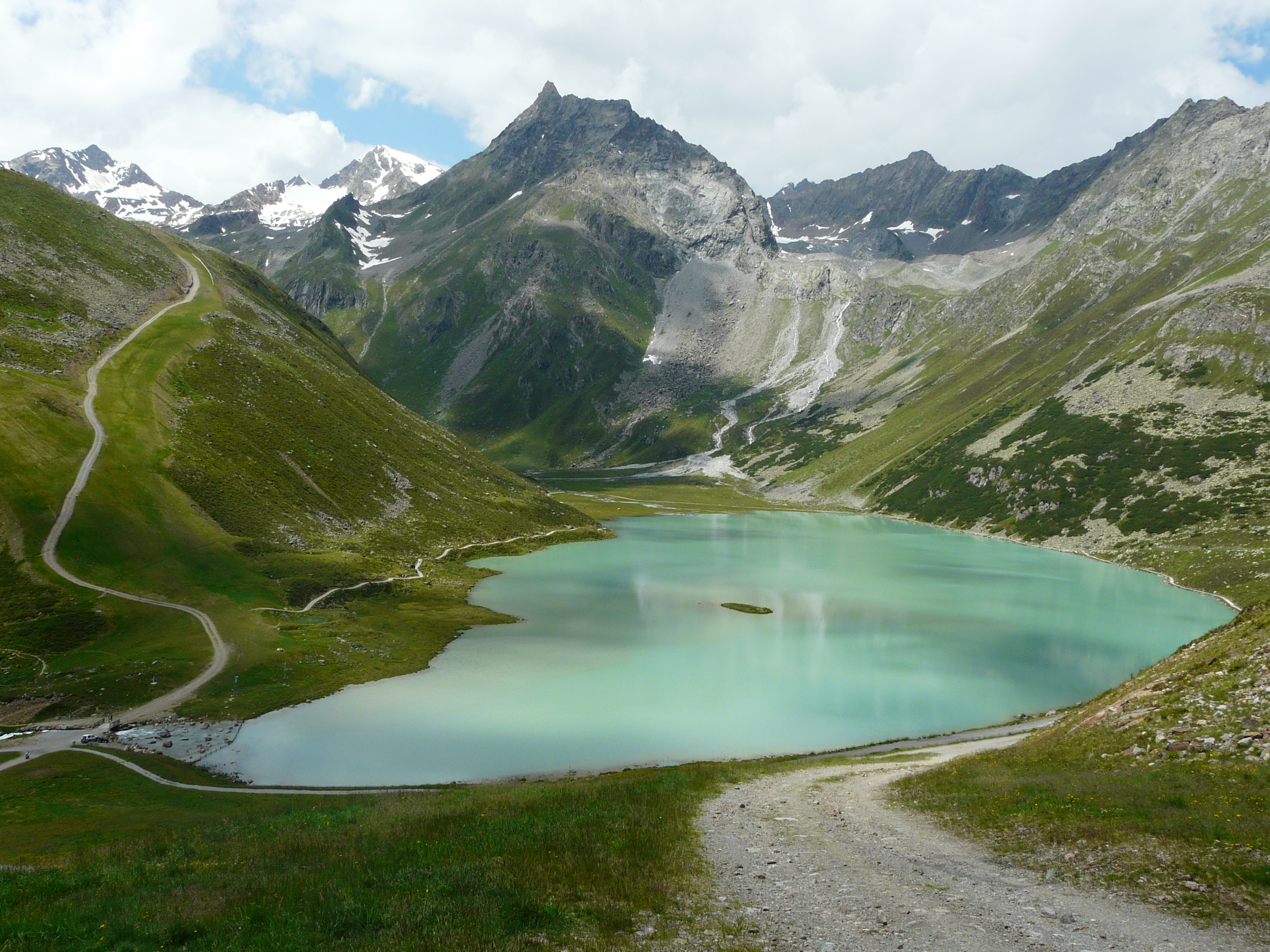

- Location within Austria
- Location: Tyrol, Austria
- Coordinates: 46°57′57″N 10°50′52″E
- Type: Moraine-dammed lake
- Max. length: 1 km (0.62 mi)
- Max. width: 0.4 km (0.25 mi)
- Surface area: 27 ha (67 acres)
- Surface elevation: 2,232 m (7,323 ft)

Rifflsee is a lake of Tyrol, Austria. It is the largest lake in the Ötztal Alps. The mountain lake is located in the Kaunergrat west of the Pitztal and is a typical moraine reservoir. The lake fills an extensive valley, the glacier-turbid water looks greenish. It is framed in the north and west by rugged peaks of the Kaunergrat, particularly striking are Seekogel and Rostizkogel. In sunny and warm weather, a considerable amount of melt water is supplied by the Seekarles, Loch, and Rifflferner.

An alpine club hut called the Rifflseehütte is located nearby.

== Images ==
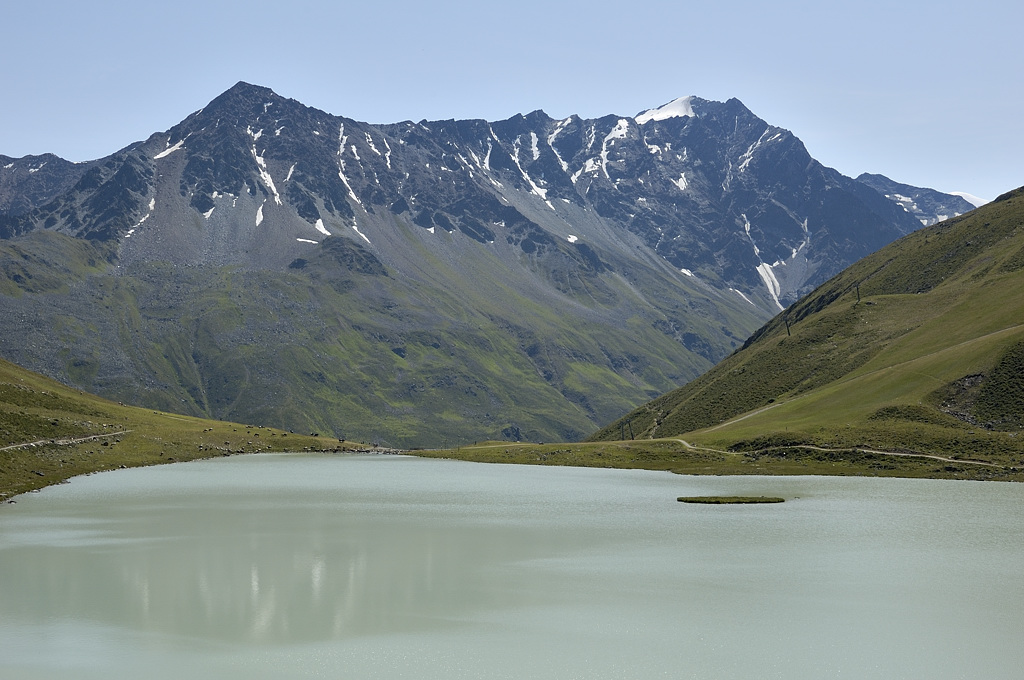

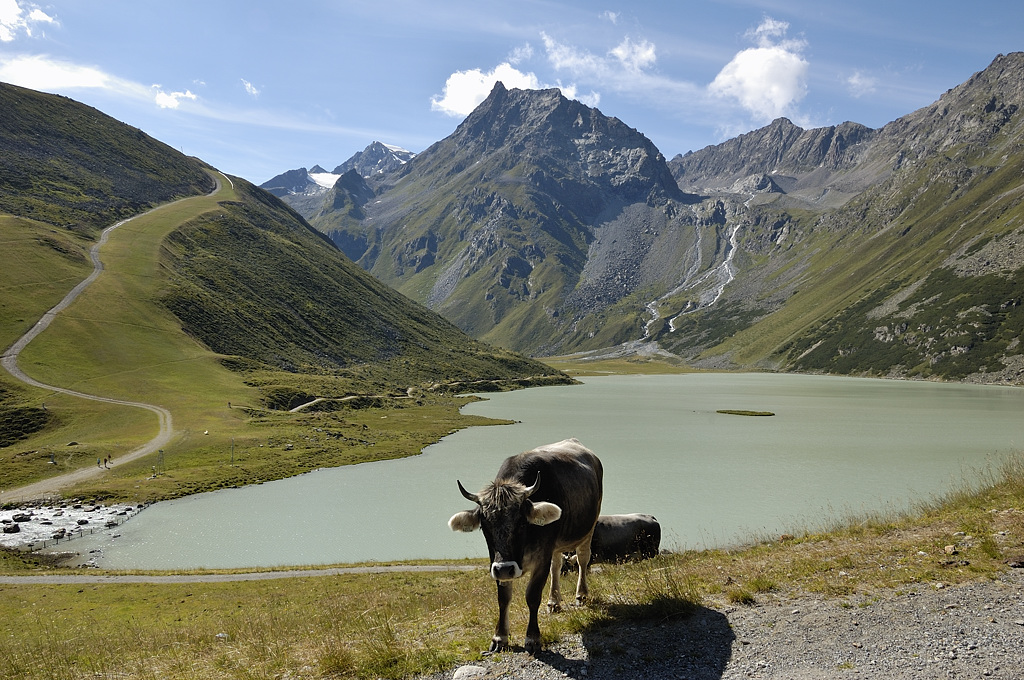

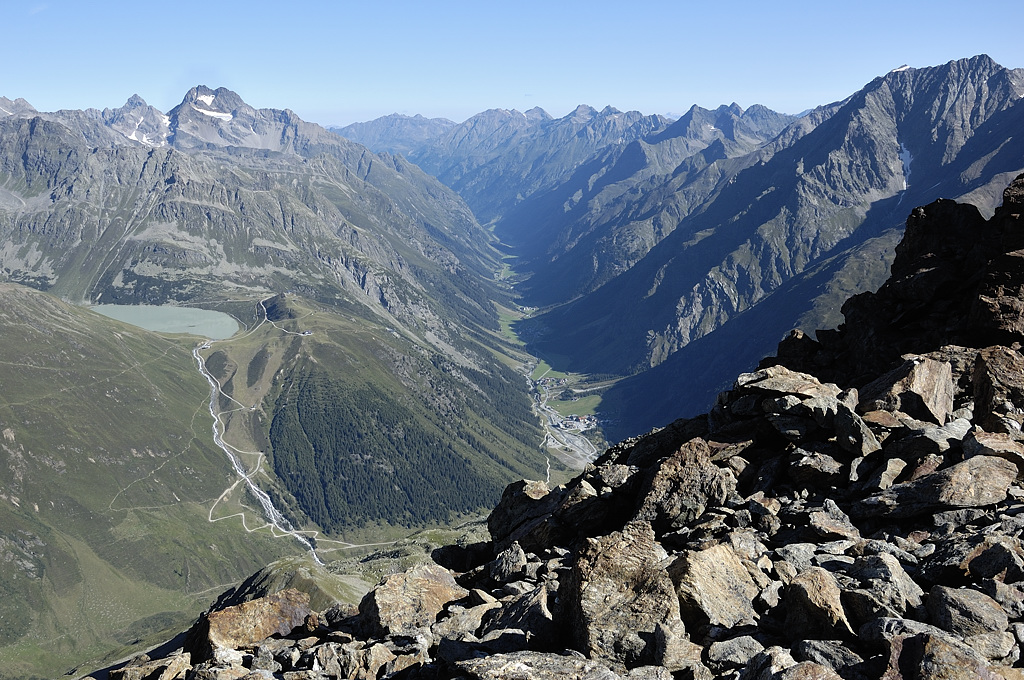
Pitztal and Rifflsee from Mittagskogel

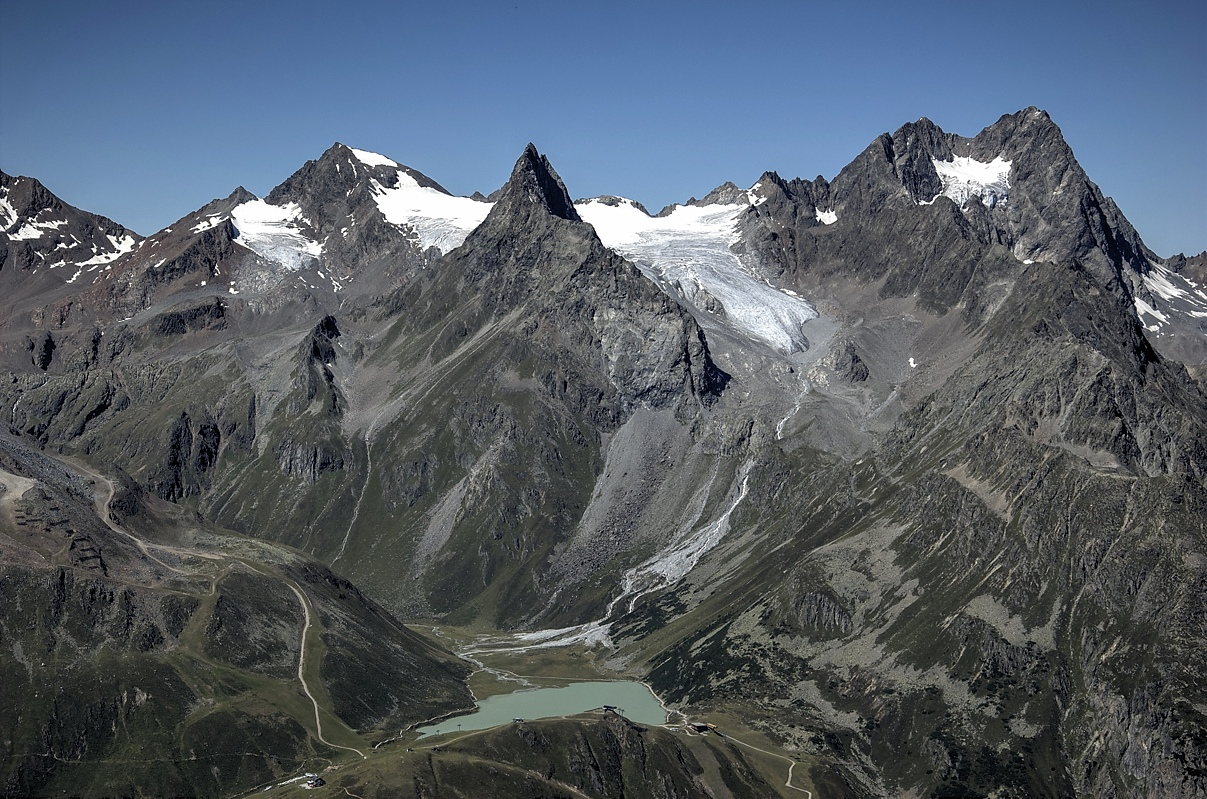
Rifflsee, Seekogel and Watzespitze
