= Seekogel =

Seekogel may refer to:

- Seekogel (Lechtal Alps)
- Seekogel (Ötztal Alps)
