= Finkenstein am Faaker See =

Finkenstein am Faaker See Bekštanj
- Municipality
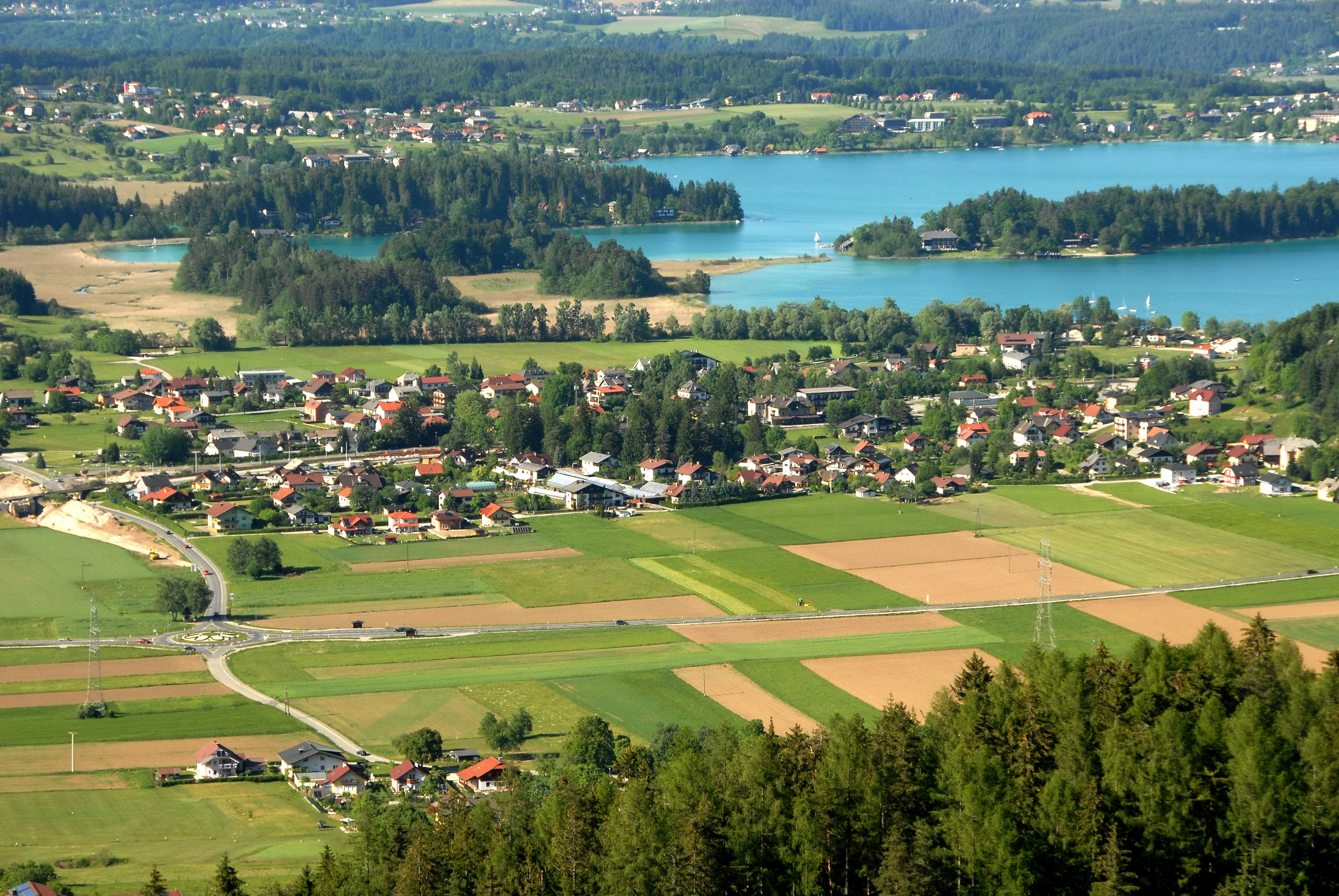
- Faak am See

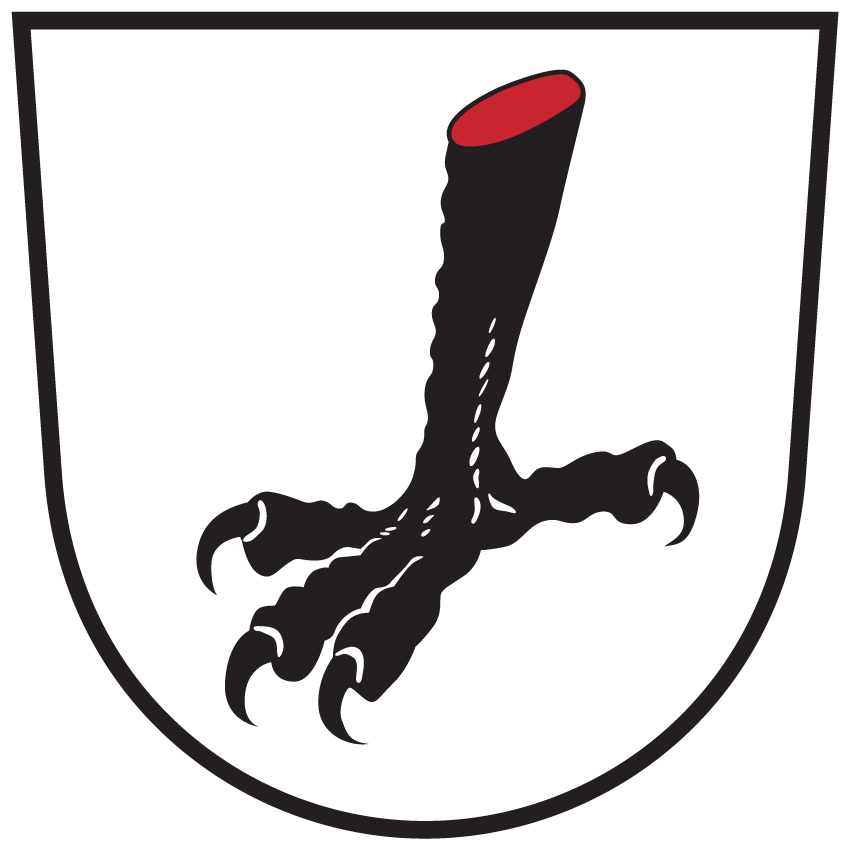
- Coat of arms

- Location within Austria
- Coordinates: 46°34′N 13°52′E
- Country: Austria
- State: Carinthia
- District: Villach-Land

Government
  - Mayor: Christian Poglitsch (ÖVP)

Area
  - Total: 102 km^{2} (39 sq mi)
- Elevation: 570 m (1,870 ft)

Population (2018-01-01)
  - Total: 9,003
  - Density: 88.3/km^{2} (229/sq mi)
- Time zone: UTC+1 (CET)
  - Summer (DST): UTC+2 (CEST)
- Postal code: 9584
- Area code: 04254
- Website: https://finkenstein.gv.at/

Finkenstein am Faaker See (Slovene: Bekštanj) is a market town in the district of Villach-Land in Carinthia, Austria.

== Geography ==
It is located south of Villach and the Drava River, on the northern slope of the Karawanks with Mt. Mittagskogel (Kepa), close to the border with Slovenia. The municipal area comprises the southern shore of Lake Faak.

The municipality includes the cadastral community of Faak am See (Bače), Ferlach (Borovlje), Fürnitz (Brnca), Greuth (Rute), Gödersdorf (Vodiča vas), Korpitsch (Grpiče), Latschach am Faakersee (Loče), Mallestig (Malošče) and Sankt Stefan (Šteben). According to the 2001 census, 5.6% of the population are Carinthian Slovenes.

== History ==
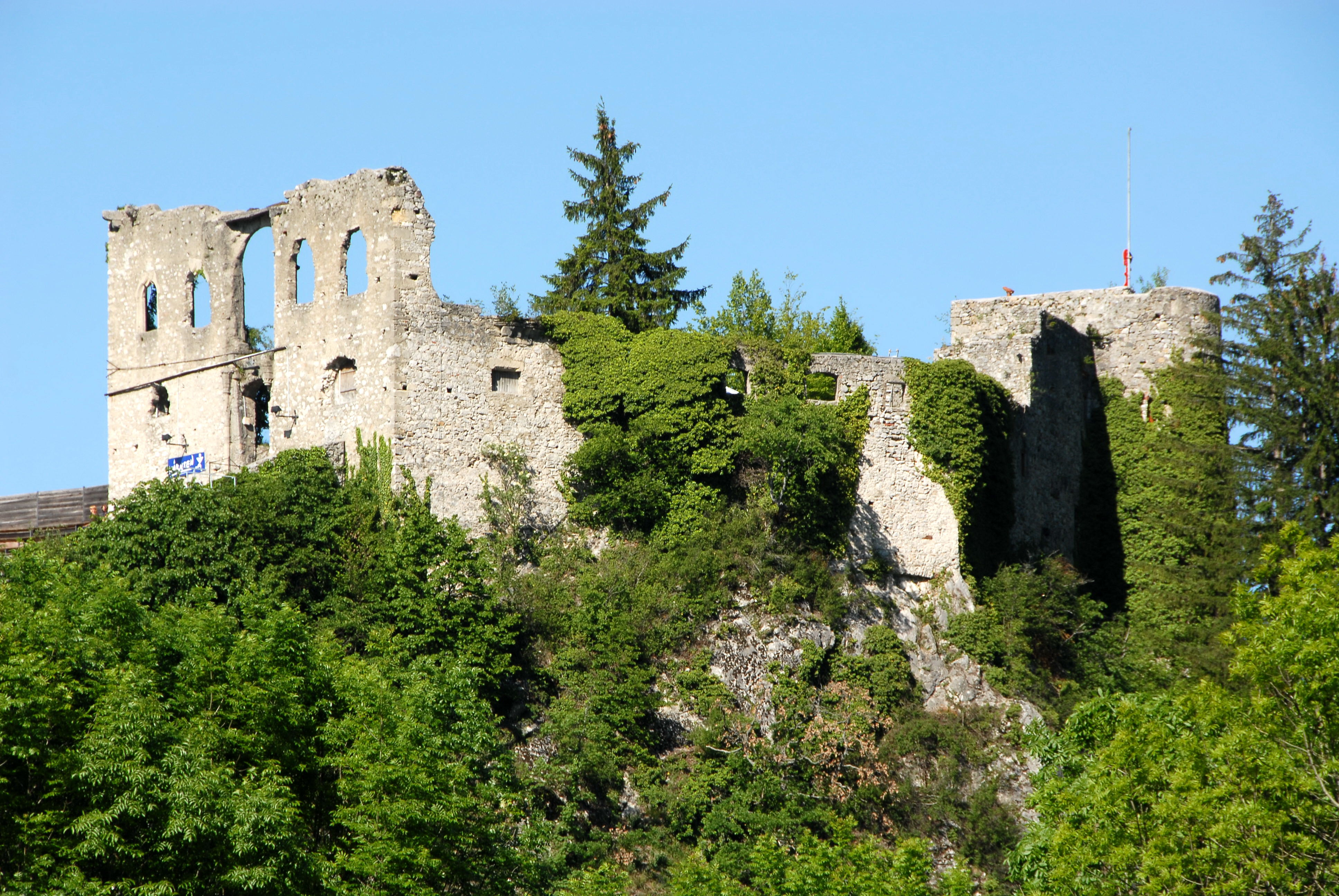
Finkenstein Castle

The municipality is named after Finkenstein Castle, a possession of the Carinthian dukes, which was first mentioned in an 1142 deed. Lend to the ducal ministeriales, the Lords of Finkenstein, it was an important outpost overlooking the Gail valley and the Carinthian estates of the Bamberg prince-bishops around Villach and Federaun Castle vis-à-vis. In 1335 the ducal estates passed to the Austrian House of Habsburg.

In 1508 Emperor Maximilian I, Duke of Carinthia since 1493, granted Finkenstein to his liegeman Siegmund von Dietrichstein, whose descendants held the castle until 1861. From the 18th century on it decayed, only ruins remain. It is today the backdrop of the Burgarena Finkenstein, an amphitheatre with 1150 seats mainly used for concerts.

The Finkenstein municipality was established in 1850 at Mallestig, it became a market town in 1979. To advert to its location on the shore of Lake Faak, the official name is Finkenstein am Faaker See since 2000. The area largely depends on tourism, moreover Elan snowboards operates a factory in Fürnitz.

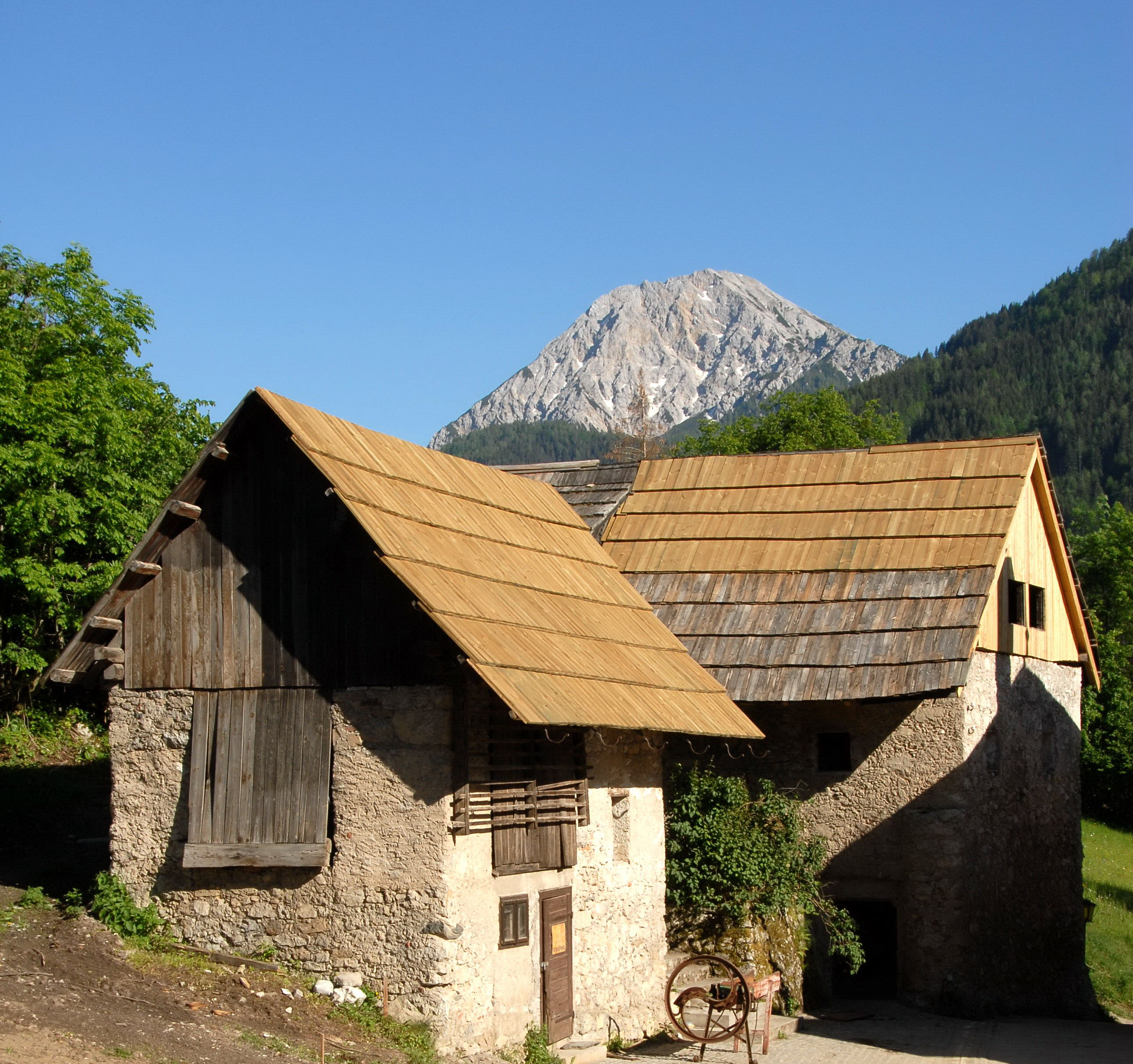
Altfinkenstein, view to Mt. Mittagskogel

== Politics ==
The municipal council (Gemeinderat) consists of 27 members. Since the 2021 local elections, it is made up of the following parties:

- Austrian People's Party (ÖVP): 14 seats
- Social Democratic Party of Austria (SPÖ): 8 seats
- Freedom Party of Austria (FPÖ): 3 seats
- The Greens - The Green Alternative (GRÜNE): 1 seat
- Unity List (EL): 1 seat

The mayor, Christian Poglitsch (ÖVP), was re-elected in 2021.

== Notable people ==
- Franc Treiber (1809–1878), priest, poet, and composer
- Günther Porod (1919–1984), physicist
- Peter Wrolich (born 1974), bicycle racer, grew up in Latschach.
