= Burgruine Finkenstein =

Medieval castle ruins in Austria

Finkenstein Castle
- Burgruine Finkenstein
- Finkenstein am Faaker See, Carinthia, Austria
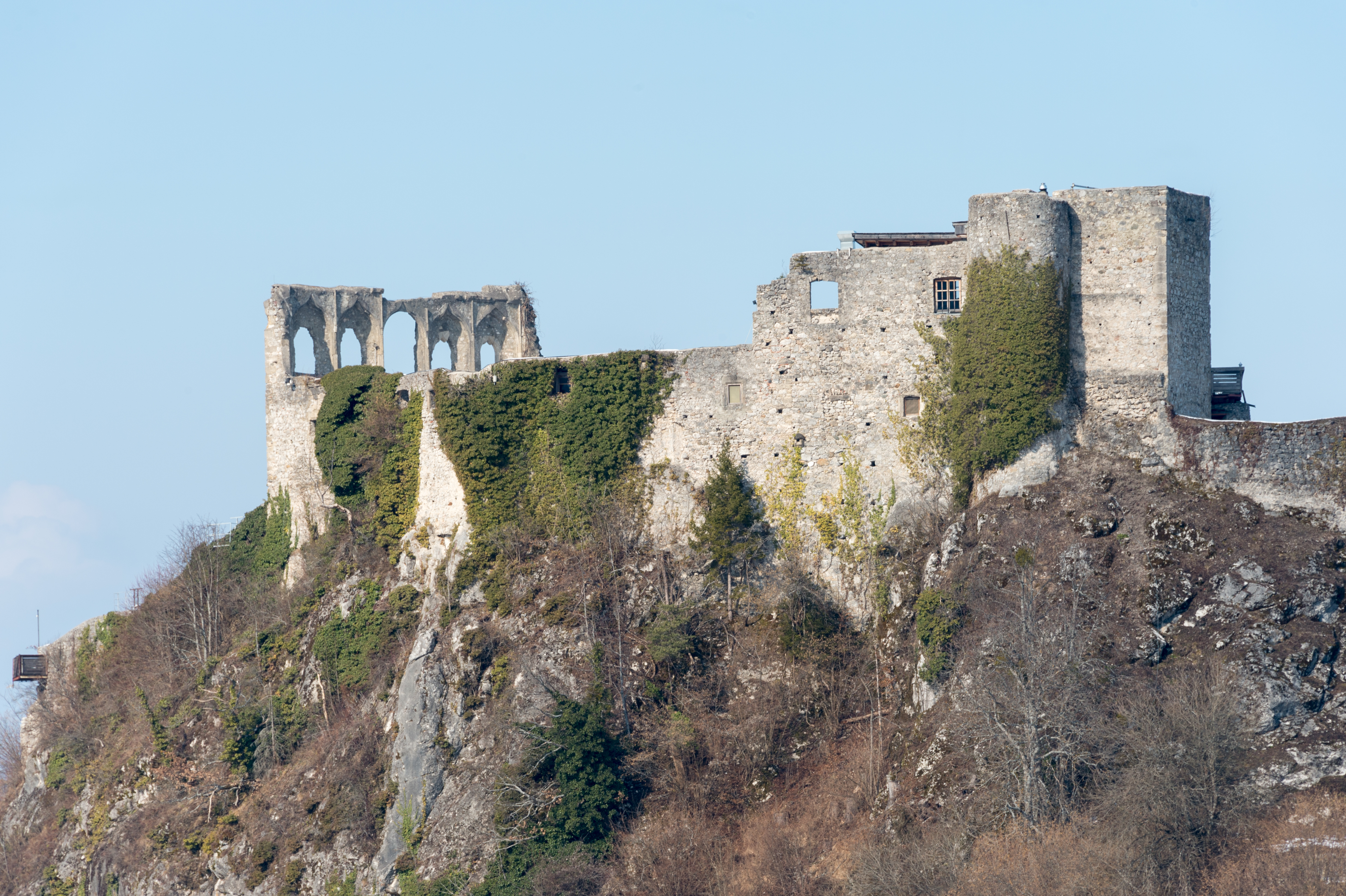

Site information
- Type: rock castle
- Open to the public: yes
- Condition: ruin

Location
- Coordinates: 46°32′48″N 13°54′11″E

Site history
- Built: early 12th century
- Built by: Finck von Finckenstein

Finkenstein Castle (also called Altfinkenstein) is a ruined medieval castle in the market town of Finkenstein, in the Austrian state of Carinthia. It is situated on a steep cliff at the southern foot of the Karawanks mountain range, high above Lake Faak, at a height of 788 metres (2,585 ft). Today the castle ruin is the backdrop of the Burgarena, an amphitheatre with 1150 seats mainly used for concerts and festivals.

== History ==
First mentioned in an 1142 deed, the castle initially belonged to the Carinthian estates owned by the Prince-Bishops of Bamberg and was enfeoffed to their local ministeriales. The lords of the castle, probably related to the Osterwitz noble family, began to call themselves von Finkenstein. In 1233, a fierce feud is recorded between the Duke Bernhard of Carinthia and the Bamberg prince-bishop Count Ekbert of Andechs, whereby Lord Henry of Finkenstein sided with the Sponheim duke. When he had Ekbert captured and arrested at Finkenstein Castle, he was immediately banned by Pope Gregory IX; nevertheless, the prince-bishop was not released until various pressures by Duke Frederick II of Austria and the Salzburg archbishop.

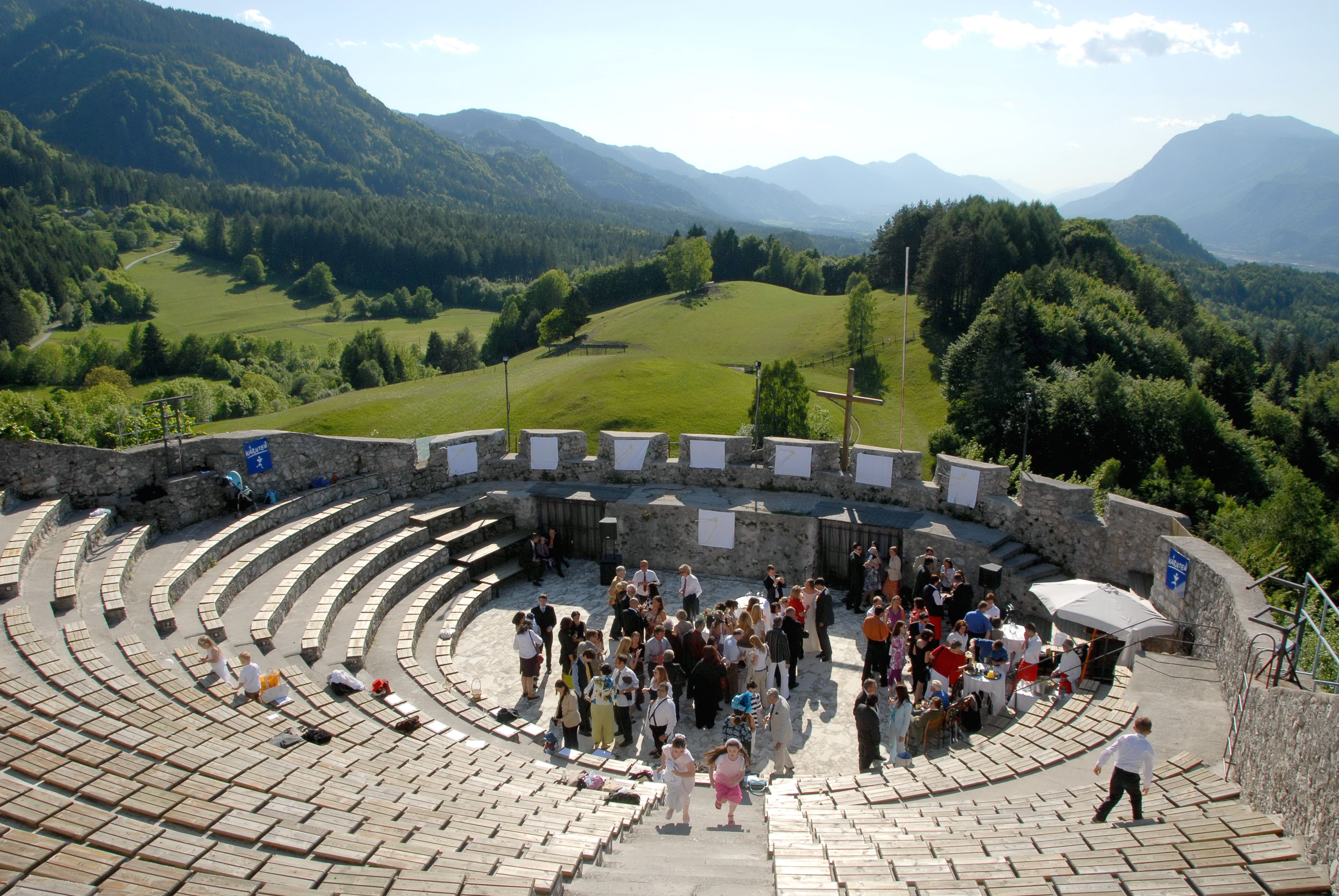
Arena

After the extinction of the Carinthian Finkensteins at the beginning of the 14th Century –a cadet branch of the family named Finck von Finckenstein came to prominence in East Prussia, possibly after participating in the Third Crusade–, the ownership fell back to the dukes of Carinthia, held by the House of Habsburg since 1335. Emperor Frederick III, Duke of Carinthia since 1424, had his consort Eleanor of Portugal brought to safety at Finkenstein, while he was besieged by his brother Archduke Albert VI in Vienna. His son Maximilian I enfeoffed the castle and its surrounding estates (Herrschaft) to his liegeman Sigismund of Dietrichstein in 1508. His descendants held the castle until 1861. Since the end of the 18th century, it was no longer inhabited and decayed; only ruins remain. From then on, the castle served as the administrator of the forestry office of the surrounding forests. The Wittgenstein family was one of the owners over the centuries from 1913-39. The castle area has been used successfully as an event location with excursion catering in the summer months since 1985. It was run by Gerhard Satran until his death in 2015.

== Building Specifications ==
Rebuilt several times, the oldest preserved parts of the castle ruins date back to the Romanesque architecture of the 12th century, including the remnants of the keep (Bergfried) on the southeastern corner. In the second half of the 15th century, several parts of the building were restored in a Late Gothic style with a staircase tower and a castle chapel. Under the rule of the House of Dietrichstein, at the beginning of the 16th century, the inner bailey received its four gates. The 15 m (49 ft) high western wall of the former Palas still stands today.

== Literature ==
- Hugo Henckel-Donnersmarck: Burgen und Schlösser in Kärnten. Leon, Klagenfurt (2 Bände).
- F.X. Kohla, G. A. v. Metnitz, G. Moro: Kärntner Burgenkunde Erster Teil - Kärntens Burgen, Schlösser Ansitze und wehrhafte Stätten Geschichtsverein für Kärnten, Klagenfurt 1973
- Michael Leischner, Alois Brandstetter: Burgen und Schlösser in Kärnten. Carinthia, Klagenfurt 2000, ISBN 3-85378-520-4.
- Georg Clam Martinic: Österreichisches Burgenlexikon. Burgen und Ruinen, Ansitze, Schlösser und Palais. 2. Auflage. Landesverlag, Linz 1992, ISBN 3-85214-559-7.
- Gerhard Stenzel: Von Burg zu Burg in Österreich. Kremayr & Scheriau, Wien 1973, ISBN 3-218-00229-X.
- Hermann Wiessner, Margareta Vyoral-Tschapka: "Burgen und Schlösser in Kärnten - Hermagor, Spittal/Drau, Villach" 2. erweiterte Auflage, Birken-Verlag, Wien 1986

== See also ==
- List of castles in Austria
