= Lake Faak =

Lake in Carinthia, Austria

- Faaker See (German)
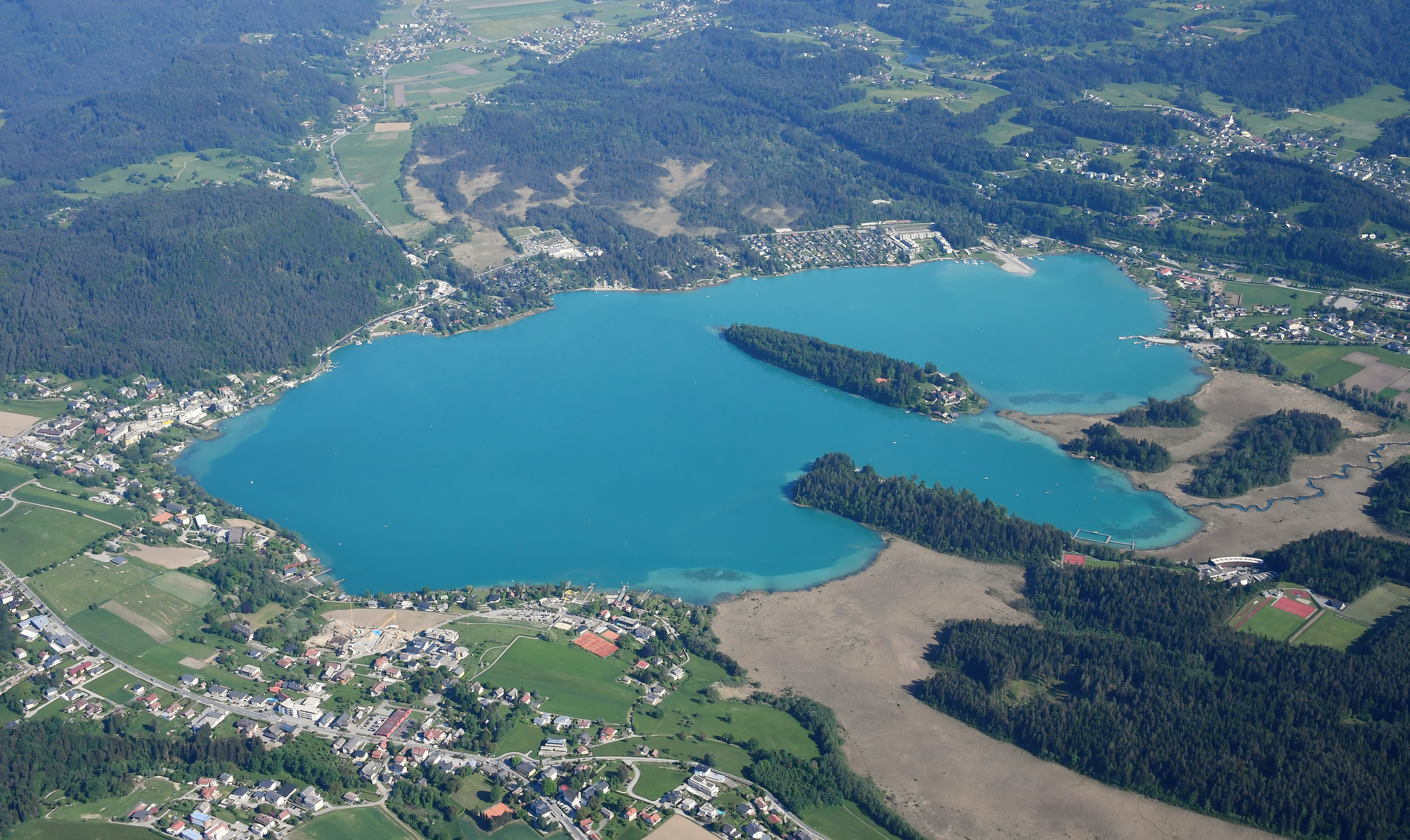
- Aerial view of Lake Faak from the northwest

- Location within Austria
- Location: Carinthia
- Coordinates: 46°34′40″N 13°55′30″E
- Primary inflows: Wourounitza, Rotschitza
- Primary outflows: Faaker Seebach to Gail River
- Basin countries: Austria
- Max. length: 2.3 km (1.4 mi)
- Max. width: 1.7 km (1.1 mi)
- Surface area: 2.2 km^{2} (0.85 sq mi)
- Average depth: 16.1 m (53 ft)
- Max. depth: 29.5 m (97 ft)
- Water volume: 35,240,000 m^{3} (28,570 acre⋅ft)
- Residence time: 1.8 years
- Surface elevation: 554 m (1,818 ft)
- Islands: Lake Faak Island (Faaker See Insel)
- Settlements: Faak, Drobollach, Egg

Lake Faak (German: Faaker See; Slovene: Baško jezero) is a lake in the Austrian state of Carinthia. With an area of approximately 2.2 km^{2} (0.85 mi^{2}), it is the state's fifth-largest lake.

== Geography ==
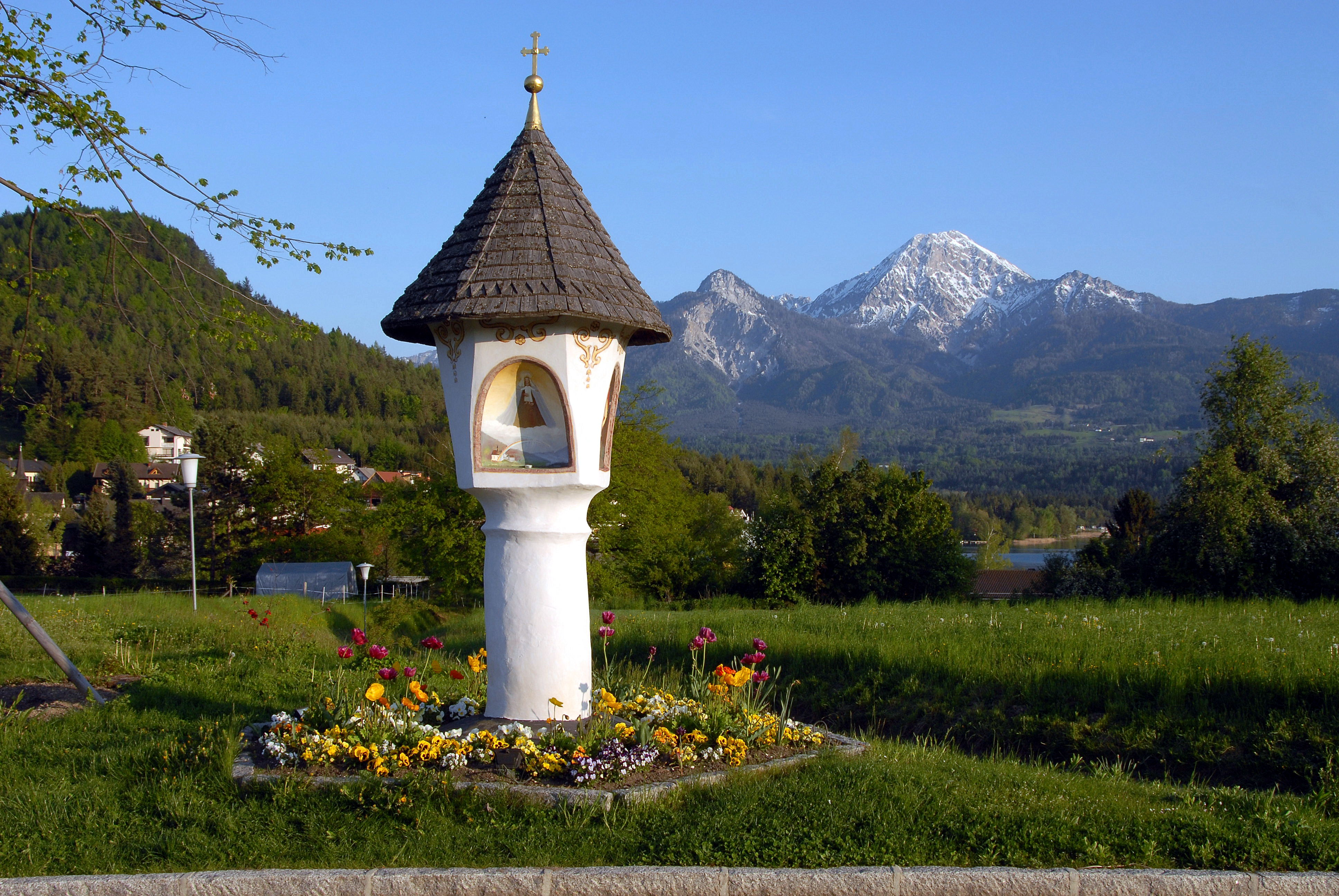
Baroque shrine on the shore, view to Mt. Mittagskogel

The lake is located southeast of Villach in the Drava Valley, below the northern slope of the Karawanks mountain range beneath Mt. Mittagskogel (Kepa). The settlements of Drobollach and Egg on the northern shore belong to the City of Villach. The village of Faak to the southwest, after which the lake is named, is part of the municipality of Finkenstein. It is the only lake in Carinthia located on the right bank of Drava River).

Lake Faak, known for its clear turquoise water, is a popular tourist destination with a wide range of hotels and restaurants on the shore. European Bike Week, the largest motorcycle rally in Europe, is annually held at the lake in September. Fishing, especially for whitefish (Reinanke) but also for carp, pike, wels, and zander, is quite common.

In 1855, Lake Faak inspired the local priest Franc Treiber to compose the song Nmav čez izaro (Over the Lake), which soon became one of the best-known Slovene folk songs, and still today is considered the unofficial anthem of the Carinthian Slovenes.
