= European Bike Week =

Annual Austrian motorcycle rally

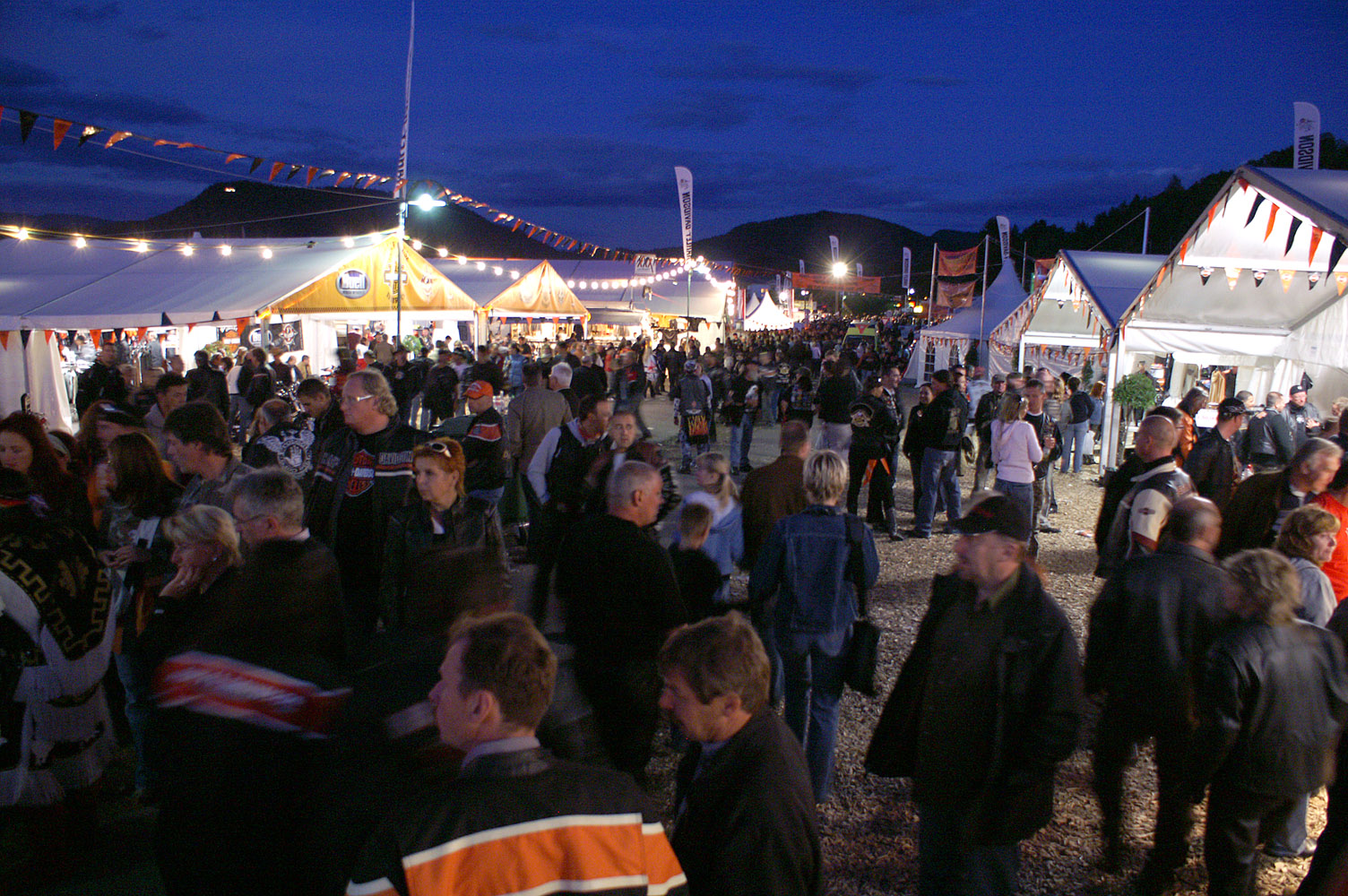
- European Bike Week: Harley village at night, 2007
- Genre: Motorcycle rally
- Frequency: Annual
- Location: Lake Faak in Austria
- Inaugurated: 1998
- Previous event: September 2–7, 2019
- Next event: September 7–12, 2020
- Attendance: 200,000 (2018)
- Patron: Harley-Davidson
- Website: europeanbikeweek.com

European Bike Week is an annual motorcycle rally held at Lake Faak in Austria. Attendance in 2018 was 200,000 people, the largest rally in Europe. Rallies in the US like Sturgis with more than 1 million, Daytona with around 350000 and Lonestar Rally with more than 400000 (within 4 days only!) as well as Myrtle beach and Laconia are bigger than Faak.

The first motorcycle meeting at Lake Faak took place in 1998 and was a Harley-Davidson anniversary event at this time. The meeting was organized by Daniela Gabriel, who worked for Harley-Davidson Europe management. The first meeting took place with 15,000 participants. The next year, the event was renamed European Bike Week. In the next few years, it grew from a small event to now the biggest event the rocker- and biker scene of Europe and the third largest event worldwide. Also, the event has been increased in the meantime to ten days.

Events of all kinds happen in organized "villages", as well as those privately offered around Lake Faak. This includes a ride-in bike show since 2002 by Custom Chrome Europe with a stunt show. Concerts take place during the week. In 2012 Kiss cover band Kiss Forever played, the Rammstein cover band Stahlzeit, as well as 10cc.

A focal point of the event is the Harley village, where campsites are located as well as the official Harley-Davidson dealership. The outlaw biker scene has its own place at the event.

An annual highlight is the parade of up to 25,000 riders take a common exit with media presence around Lake Faak.

In 2012 motorbikes worth half a million euros were stolen.
