= Seekogel (Lechtal Alps) =

Coordinates: 47°12′16″N 10°28′33″E

Seekogel is a mountain in the Lechtal Alps.

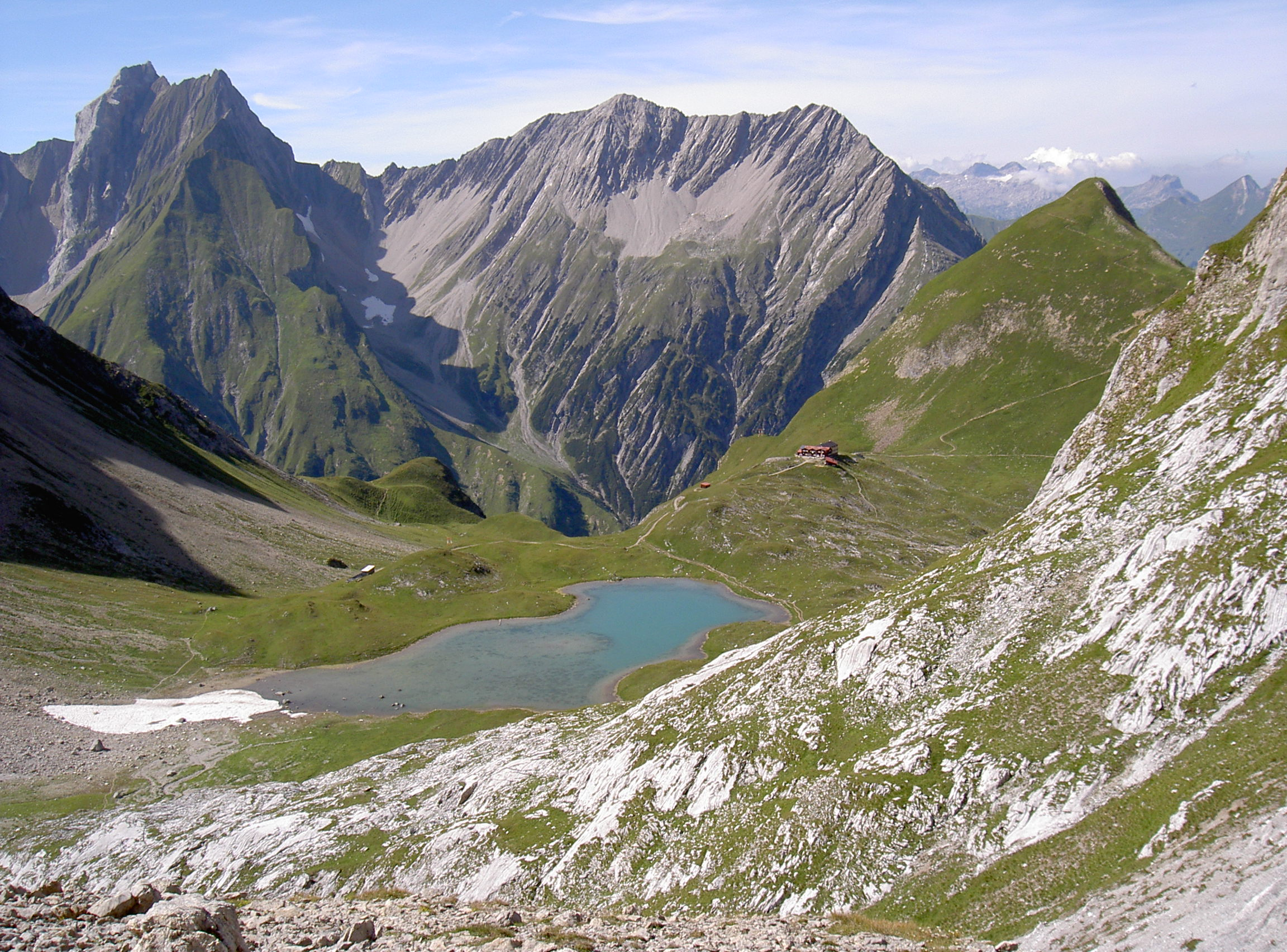
The Lechtal Alps (Seekogel is on the right)
