= Seekogel (Ötztal Alps) =

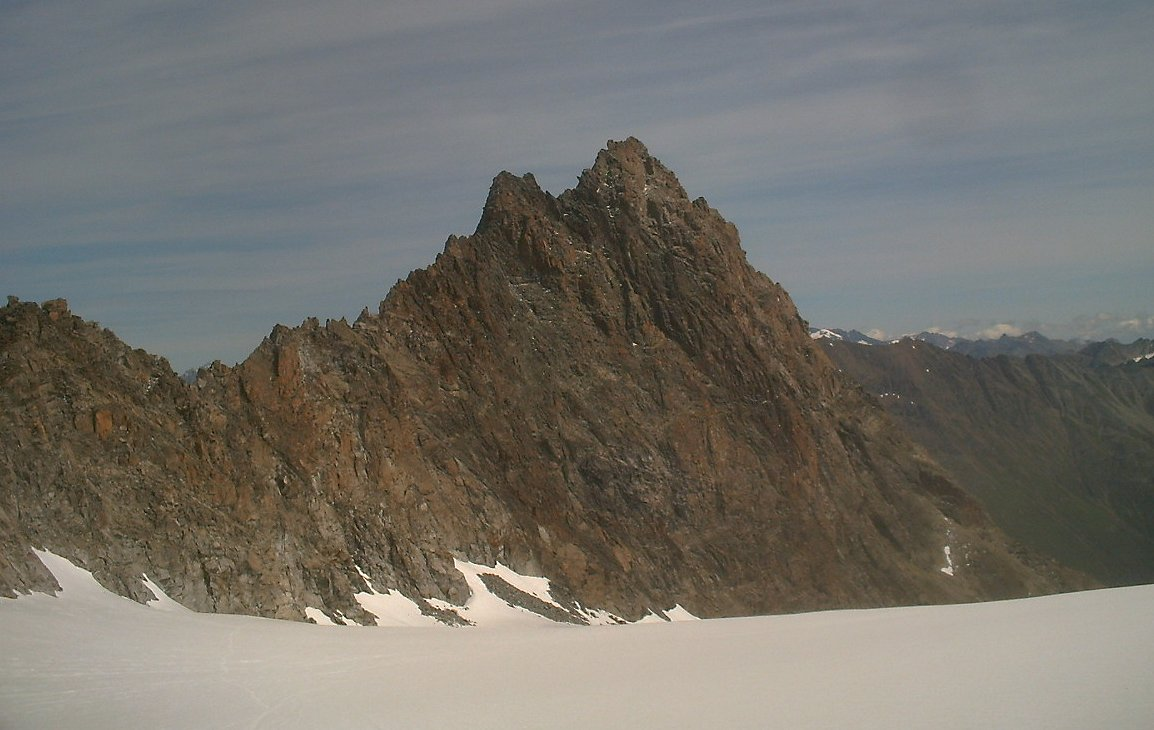
- West ridge of the Seekogel from the Löcherferner (glacier).

Highest point
- Elevation: 3,358 m (11,017 ft)
- Prominence: 170 m (560 ft)
- Parent peak: Rostizkogel
- Coordinates: 46°58′17″N 10°48′39″E

Geography
- Location within Austria
- Location: Tyrol, Austria
- Parent range: Ötztal Alps

Climbing
- First ascent: 20 Jul 1899 by F. Hörtnagel and Hans Margreiter
- Easiest route: Southface or east ridge (both UIAA-III) from the Riffelseehütte

The Seekogel is a mountain in the Kaunergrat group of the Ötztal Alps.

== Gallery ==
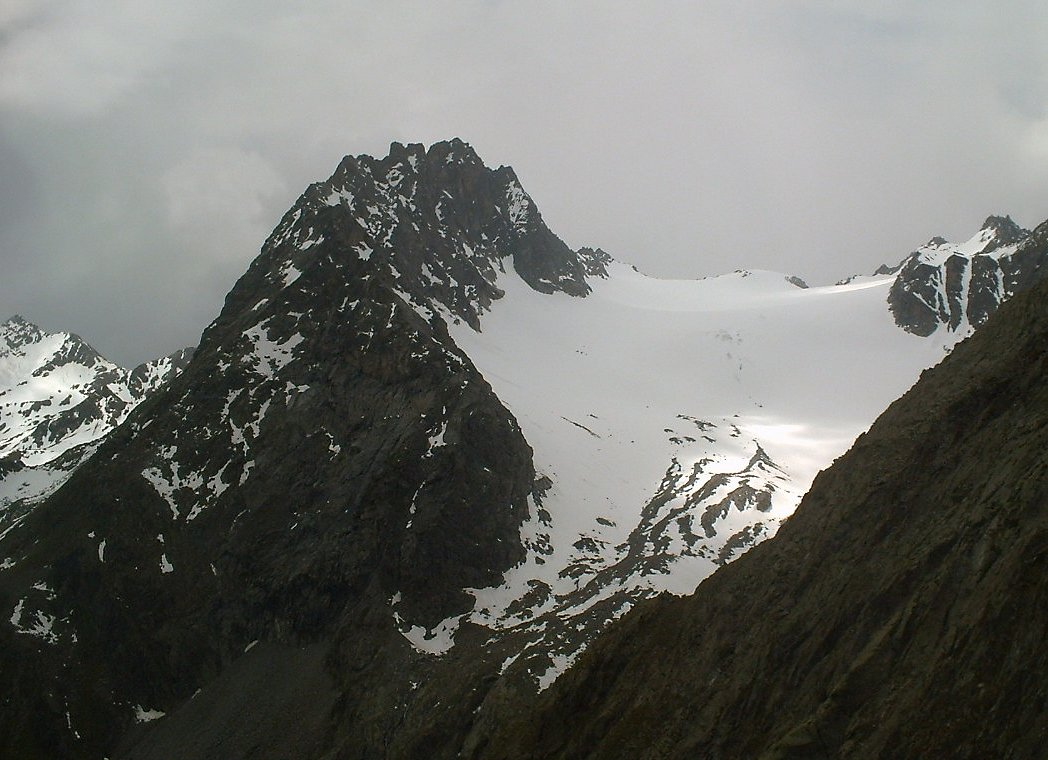
The Seekogel flanked by the Seekarlesferner as seen from the Zuragkogel from the northeast

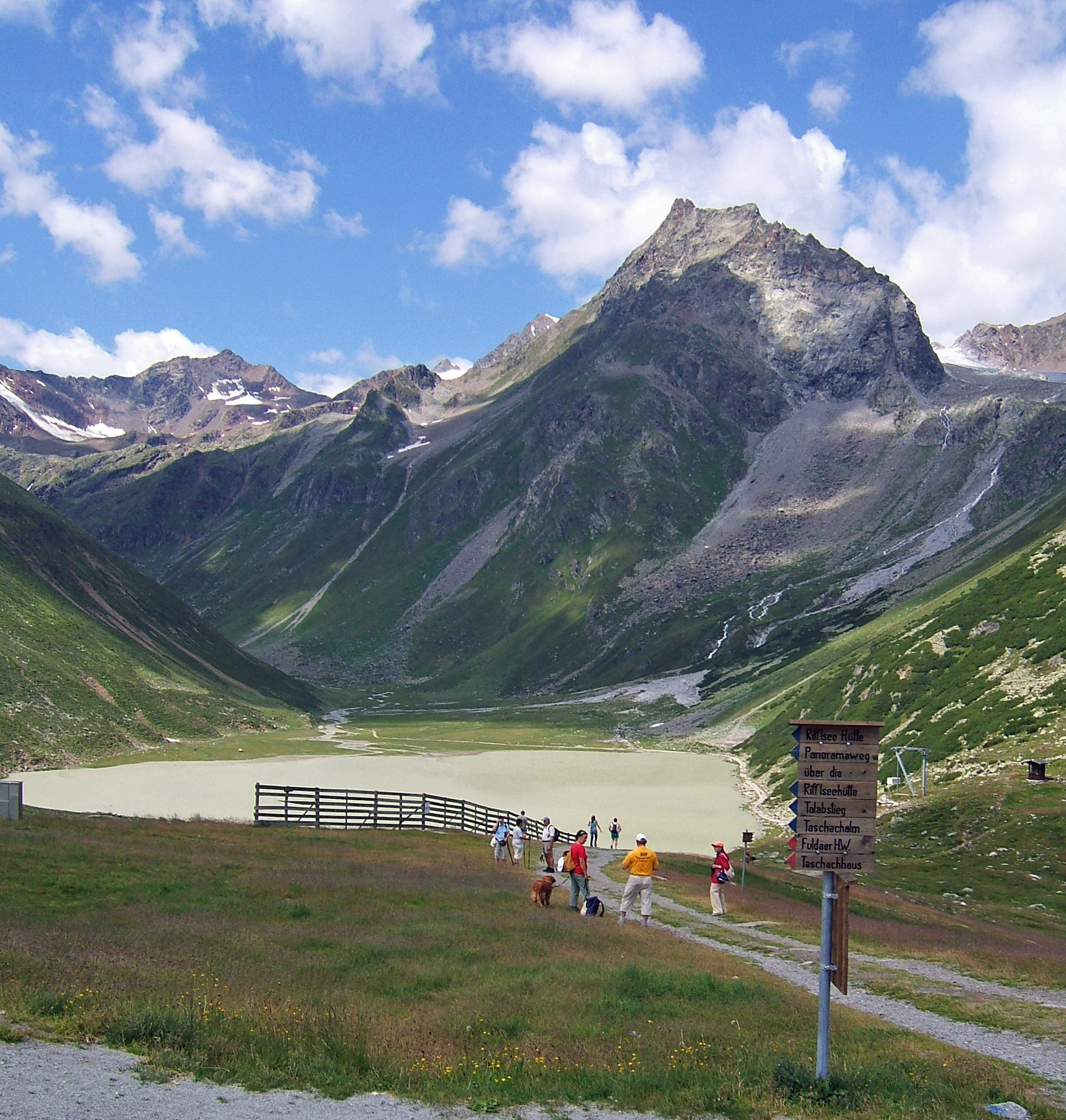
The Seekogel as seen from the east from the Riffelsee

== See also ==
- List of mountains in Austria
