= Burgruine Federaun =

Castle ruins in Austria

Coordinates: 46°34′13″N 13°48′44″E

- Carinthia, Austria
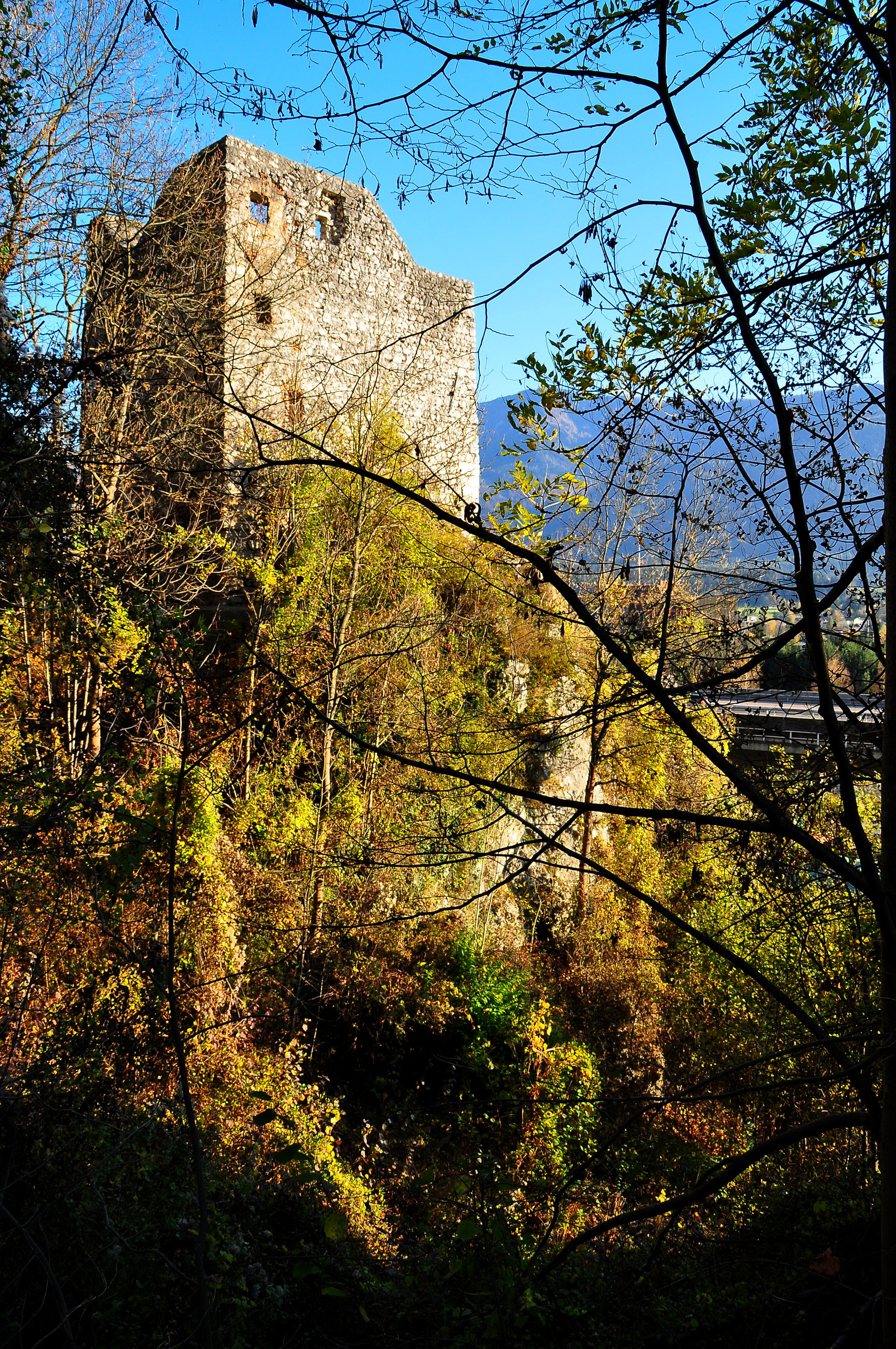

Site information
- Type: Castle

Burgruine Federaun is a castle in Carinthia, Austria.

== Location ==
The former bambergic fortification is located directly above the historically important long-distance road Villach -Tarvis, which crosses the Gail below the Burgfelsen. The fortress also includes a bridge watchtower on a rock above the river, which served as a barrier to the street and later became a residential building. The second mentioned tower near Federaun could not be located. The castle is accessible from the east via Warmbad / Graschelitzen through a partly rocky and steep path.

== History ==
The oldest documentary mention of Federaun dates back to 1311. In the middle of the 13th century, Rudolf von Ras (from Rosegg in the Rosental, see also Herren Von Ras) took possession of the castle and used it as a base for his robbery attacks on the transit trade Italy. In 1255 Heinrich von Bamberg Bishop put an end to this activity and expelled the robber.

The decline of the Federaun castle was probably already in place before the 17th century.

== Attachment ==
From the main castle, with its mighty anterior facade, there are only small remnants left. The main castle from the late 12th century is located in the western part of the heights. The Burganlage was later extended to the east. The result of these extensions is an unusually large plant with two large Vorburg plants. However, the beautifully bricked conical cistern in the courtyard is remarkable. A vault, which is not defined in time, is still in good condition. At the eastern end, the castle is secured by a deep trench.

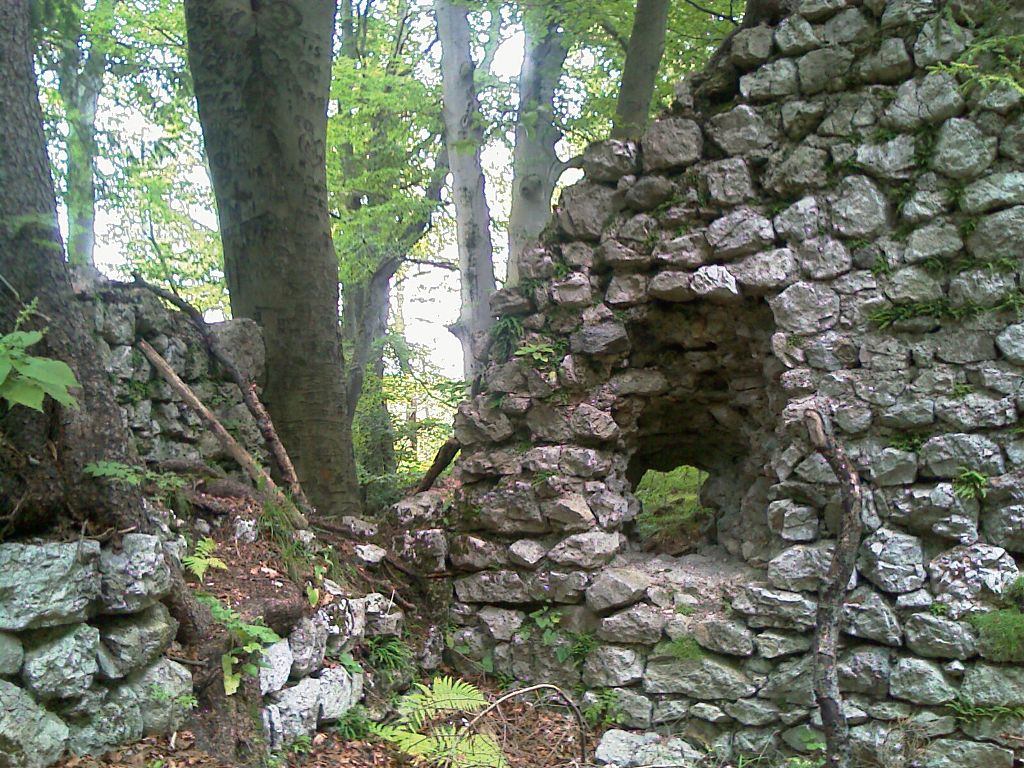
Mauerwerk aus Hauptburg

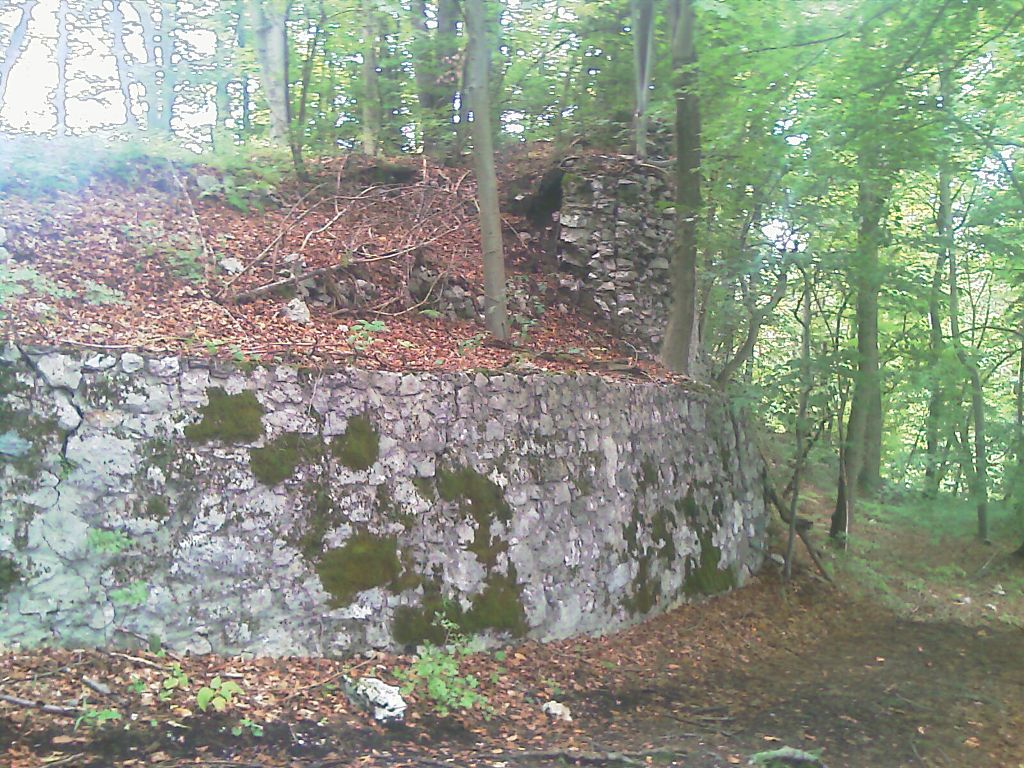
Mauerwerk in 1. Vorburg

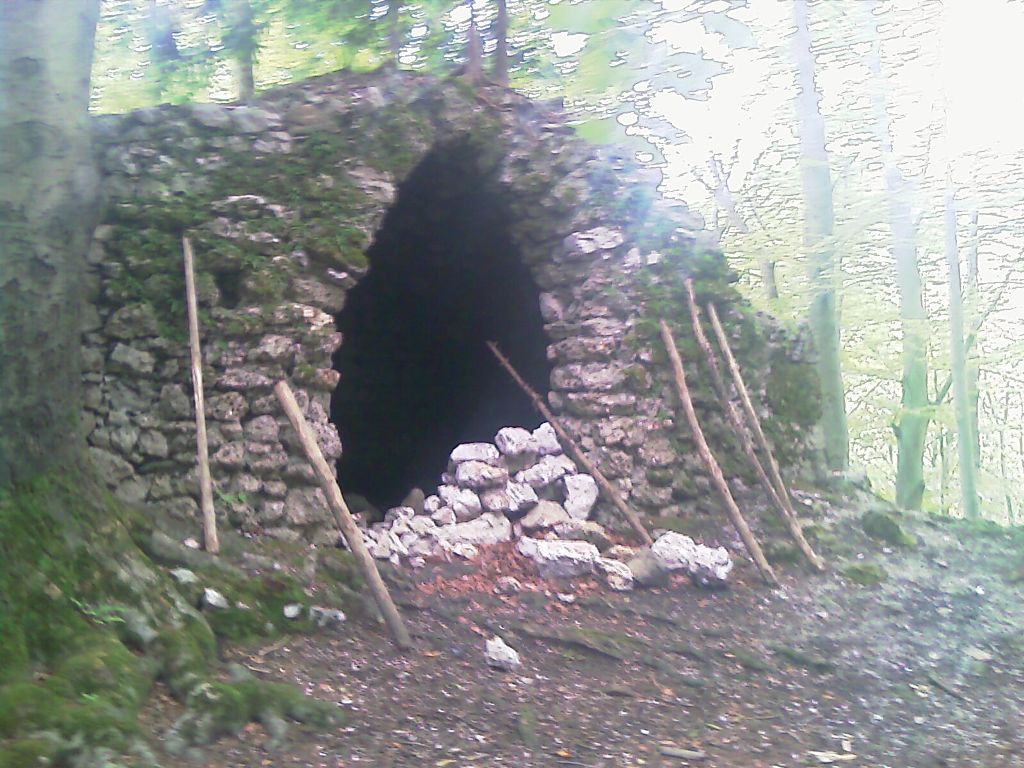
Gewölbe

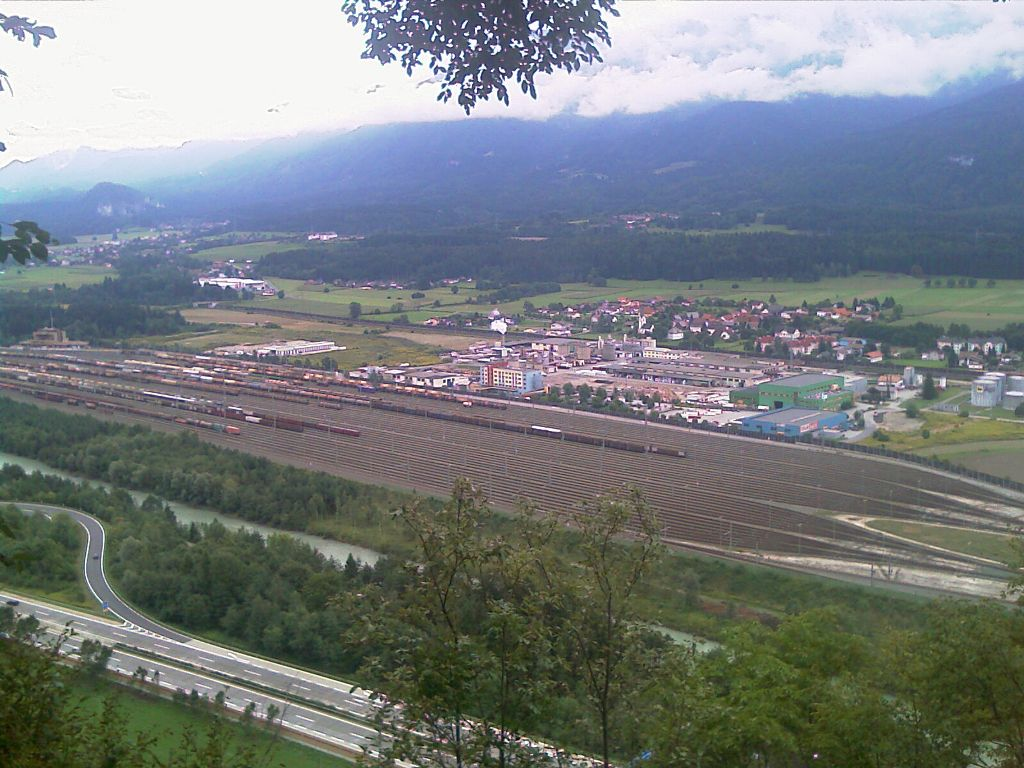
Blick von der Burg auf den Verschiebebahnhof Fürnitz

== See also ==
- List of castles in Austria
