= Franc Treiber =

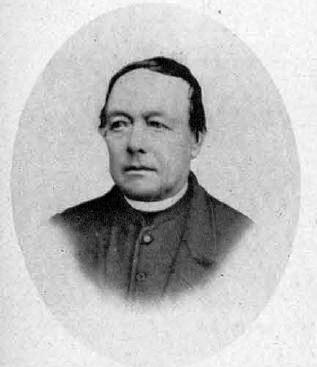

Franc Treiber (28 January 1809 – 24 October 1878) was a Slovene Roman Catholic priest, poet, and composer.

== Life and work ==
Born in Faak (Bače), Carinthia, Treiber studied theology at the Klagenfurt seminary under Anton Martin Slomšek and was ordained priest in 1834. He initially worked as a chaplain and catechist, and in 1846 became parson of Sankt Jakob im Rosental (Šentjakob v Rožu). Here he founded a church choir which he led more than 30 years. In 1872 he, together with Valentin Janežič, brother of Anton Janežič, established the first Slovene loan office in Sankt Jakob.

Treiber composed numerous songs in the Carinthian Slovene dialect. His melancholic song Nmav čez izaro (Over the Lake), written in 1855, became one of the best-known Slovene folk songs and is considered the unofficial anthem of Carinthian Slovenes.

He died in Sankt Jakob. A commemorative plaque in his honour was erected in 2009 at the Latschach (Loče) parish church.

== See also ==
- List of Slovenian composers
