= Mittagskogel =

Mountain in the countries of Slovenia and Austria

Mittagskogel / Kepa
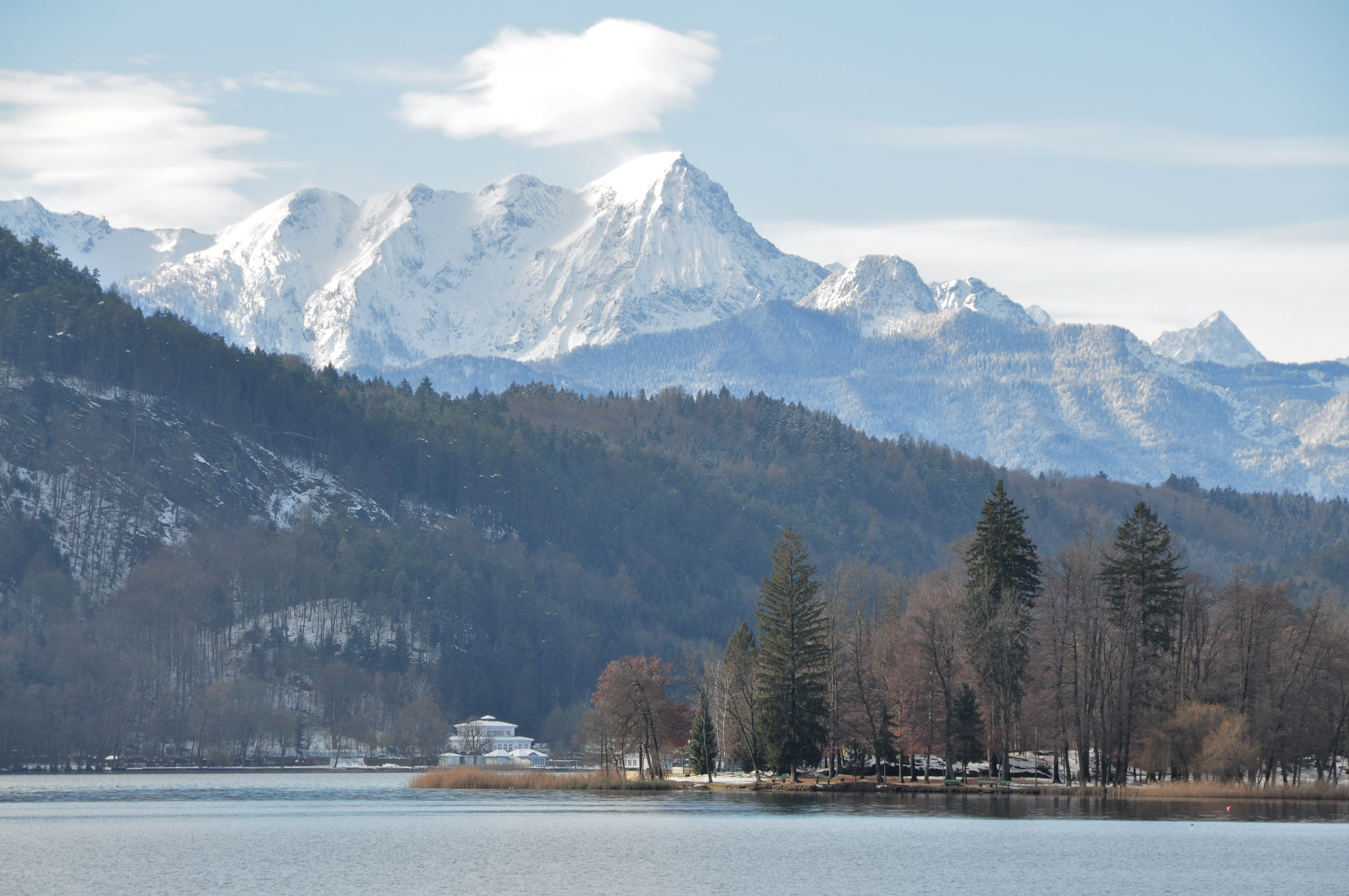
- View from Wörthersee

Highest point
- Elevation: 2,145 m (7,037 ft)
- Prominence: 706 m (2,316 ft)
- Coordinates: 46°30′24″N 13°56′56″E

Geography
- Location within Alps
- Location: Upper Carniola, Slovenia; Carinthia, Austria
- Parent range: Karawanks

The Mittagskogel (German) or Kepa (Slovenian) has an elevation of 2,145 metres (7,037 ft) aA, and is thus the third highest mountain in the Karawanks range, after Hochstuhl/Stol and the Vertratscha/Vrtača. It is located on the border between Slovenia and Austria.

== Geography ==
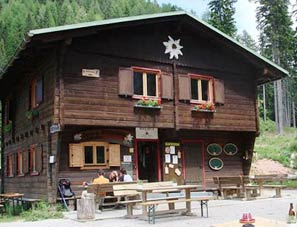
Bertahütte

The massif consisting of main dolomite and Dachstein limestone beds rises between the Slovene Sava valley in the south and the Austrian Drau basin in the north. Its steep northern face, resembling a rocky pyramid with a rounded summit is a landmark in Carinthia.

The mountain is usually climbed from the village of Belca on its Slovenian side. An Alpine club hut, the Berta Hut, located at an elevation of 1,567 m (5,141 ft), can be reached from the Austrian municipality of Finkenstein; from here, the normal route leads to the summit.

== Name ==
Mentioned as Copan mons in a 1650 map, the German oronym Mittagskogel (Midday Peak) denotes the position of the sun above the summit at noon. The mountain is also called Jepa in the Carinthian Slovene dialect.
