= Rostizkogel =

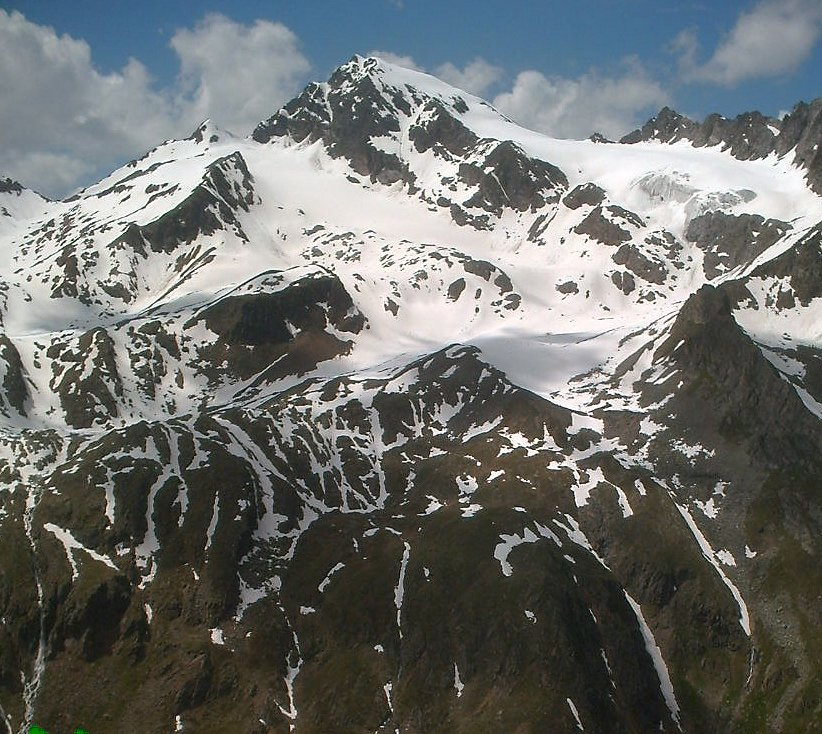
- Rostizkogel from the east from the Grubengrat (2839 m)

Highest point
- Elevation: 3,394 m (11,135 ft)
- Prominence: 213 m (699 ft)
- Parent peak: Watzespitze
- Coordinates: 46°58′07″N 10°47′41″E

Geography
- Location within Austria
- Location: Tyrol, Austria
- Parent range: Ötztal Alps

Climbing
- First ascent: 23 Aug 1893 by Theodor Petersen with the guides Johann Praxmarer and S. Lentsch

The Rostizkogel is a mountain in the Kaunergrat group of the Ötztal Alps, closely related to the Watzespitze.
