= House of Liechtenstein =

Ruling dynasty of the Principality of Liechtenstein

- Coat of arms of Liechtenstein

- Banner of the House of Liechtenstein
- Country: Principality of Liechtenstein
- Origin: Liechtenstein Castle, Maria Enzersdorf, Austria
- Founded: 1608 (as a princely house)
- Founder: Karl I (first prince)
- Current head: Hans-Adam II
- Titles: Prince of Liechtenstein; Duke of Troppau; Duke of Krnov; Count of Rietberg von Liechtenstein (surname)
- Style: Serene Highness
- Website: www.fuerstenhaus.li

The House of Liechtenstein (German: Haus Liechtenstein), from which the principality takes its name, is the family which reigns by hereditary right over the principality of Liechtenstein. Only dynastic members of the family are eligible to inherit the throne. The dynasty's membership, rights and responsibilities are defined by a law of the family, which is enforced by the reigning prince and may be altered by vote among the family's dynasts, but which may not be altered by the Government or Parliament of Liechtenstein.

== History ==
The family originates from Liechtenstein Castle in Lower Austria (near Vienna), which the family possessed from at least 1136 to the 13th century, and from 1807 onwards.

The progenitor Hugo von Liechtenstein (d. 1156) built Liechtenstein Castle around 1122-36 on a fief that he received from the Babenberg margraves of Austria. He also received Petronell on the Danube and Rohrau Castle, near the then border with the Kingdom of Hungary, at first as a fief, from 1142 as a free property (allod).

Heinrich I (d. 1265), lord of Liechtenstein and Petronell, was given the lordship of Nikolsburg in southern Moravia as free property from Ottokar II of Bohemia, whom he supported politically, in 1249. It remained one of the most important seats until it was sold in 1560. In 1394, John I of Liechtenstein, lord of Nikolsburg (d. 1397), acquired the Feldsberg estate (then Lower Austria, today Valtice, Czech Republic). When he fell out of favor with Albert III, Duke of Austria, for whom he had long conducted government business, he lost his lands south of the Danube, but could keep Nikolsburg because Bohemia and Moravia did not come to the Habsburgs until 1526.

Through the centuries, the dynasty acquired vast swathes of land, predominantly in Moravia, Lower Austria, Silesia and Styria, though in all cases, these territories were parts of countries that were ruled by other dynasties, particularly the House of Habsburg, to whom several Liechtenstein princes served as close advisers.

At the turn of the 16th and 17th centuries, the three brothers Karl, Maximilian and Gundakar initiated a new period in the family history. The nobility and population in Austria, Hungary, and Bohemia had predominantly converted to Protestantism during the Reformation period of the 16th century; however, the three brothers converted back to the Catholic faith at the right time before the outbreak of the mainly religiously motivated Thirty Years' War. The Habsburgs, who ruled the Holy Roman Empire almost continuously until 1806 as Holy Roman Emperors, had always preserved their Catholic faith. The three brothers supported the ultra-catholic Emperor Ferdinand II in crushing the Bohemian Revolt. Maximilian, as Field Marshal, won the Battle of White Mountain. On diplomatic missions, Gundaker prepared the Catholic League, which fought for the Habsburgs in the Thirty Years' War. Karl restored order as Viceroy of Bohemia and oversaw the arrests and executions of the 27 Protestant leaders of the uprising. For this they were all three made Princes of the Holy Roman Empire. In addition, they were able to cheaply acquire huge lands from expelled and dispossessed Protestant nobles in Bohemia and Moravia, especially since Karl himself, as the Emperor's representative, carried out these confiscations. He also received the Duchy of Troppau and the Duchy of Krnov (Jägerndorf) in Silesia from the Emperor. The respective Fürst still holds these two ducal titles to this day.

The Moravian and Bohemian possessions acquired at the time included: Bučovice, Moravská Třebová, Moravský Krumlov, Uherský Ostroh (with Kunovice and Hluk), Šternberk and a palace in Prague (on Malostranské náměstí). In 1802 Velké Losiny was added. Most of these estates remained in the possession of the princely house until Czechoslovakia expropriated them in 1945. In 1622, Maximilian founded a monastery in Vranov, in whose family crypt almost all Liechtenstein princes were buried, until a new crypt was built in Vaduz in 1960.

Despite all the extensive land acquisitions, the rise of the House of Liechtenstein was still missing the decisive factor: Although they bore the title of Princes in the Empire, this was only an honorary title, because the family did not yet possess any territory with semi-sovereignty (Landeshoheit) within the Empire. All their lands were fiefs (feudal grants) granted to them by the Habsburg emperor in his capacity as both Bohemian king and Austrian archduke, but none of them depended directly on the Imperial crown, the group of so-called immediate territories that formed the apex of the fief pyramid and enjoyed the highest prestige and, more importantly, were represented with hereditary seats in the Imperial Diet (Reichstag). The then head of the family, Prince Hans-Adam I, was able to arrange the purchase from the Hohenems family of the minuscule Lordship of Schellenberg in 1699, and the County of Vaduz in 1712. Schellenberg and Vaduz were indeed a lordship and a county respectively, which were directly subordinate to the emperor as feudal lord.

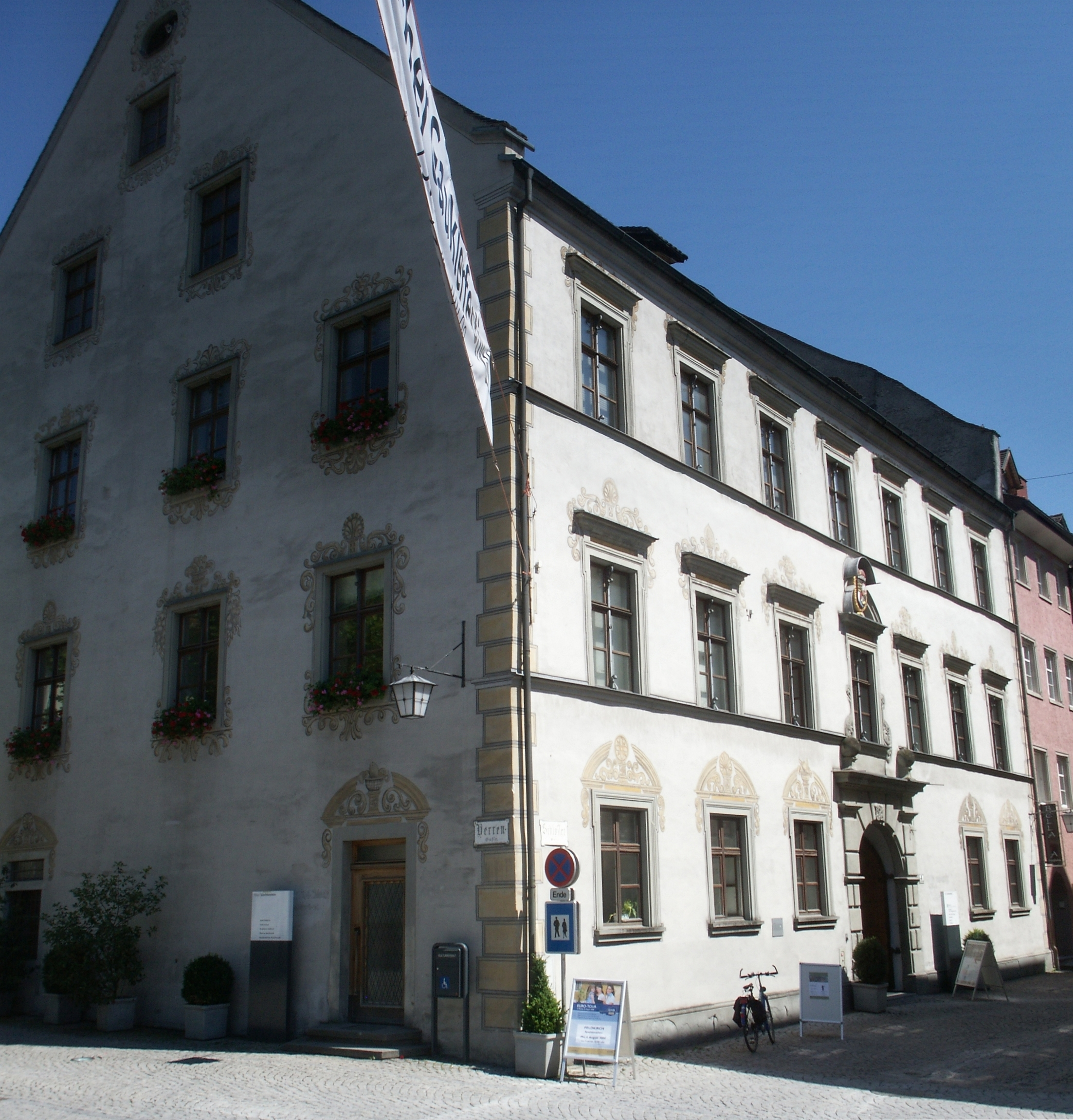
The former administrative building of the Governors of Liechtenstein in Feldkirch, Austria

On 23 January 1719, after the purchase had been made, Charles VI as Holy Roman Emperor decreed Vaduz and Schellenberg to be united and raised to the dignity of a Principality by the name of "Liechtenstein", in honour of "[his] true servant, Anton Florian of Liechtenstein", the successor of Hans-Adam I. On this date, the brand new principality of Liechtenstein became a member state of the Holy Roman Empire whereby the ruling princes became the monarchs of Liechtenstein and they finally received the longed-for hereditary seat in the Reichstag. However, the ruling princes did not set foot in their new principality for several decades, a testament to the pure political expediency of the purchases. Since the small country, far away from Vienna and Bohemia, consisted only of farming villages, the administration was installed in the nearest town, Feldkirch in Austria, where the prince had an office building built for his governor. Vaduz Castle, the center of the medieval county of that name, remained unused and was rented out as a restaurant for hikers until the late 19th century.

With the end of the Holy Roman Empire in 1806, the Principality of Liechtenstein became sovereign and was recognized in this status by the Congress of Vienna in 1814/1815. Johann I became the first sovereign ruler. He acquired a number of castles and estates in Austria for his numerous sons, which are still mostly inhabited by their descendants today. The reigning princes continued to live in their magnificent Vienna residences, Liechtenstein City Palace and Liechtenstein Garden Palace, and on their Moravian and Bohemian estates, with Lednice and Valtice (German names: Eisgrub and Feldsberg) as their main residence. The border between Austria and Bohemia-Moravia, both member states of the Austro-Hungarian Empire under the Habsburg rule, ran through the park between the two castles. The local administration of the Principality of Liechtenstein was overseen by a governor, and the government office was located at the prince's seat.

It was not until the Occupation of Czechoslovakia (1938–1945) by Nazi Germany at the beginning of World War II that the residence was moved from Valtice to Vaduz. The prince had opposed the annexation of Czech territory, including Valtice and Lednice, into Sudetenland, and as a consequence his properties were confiscated by the Nazis, and the family then relocated to Vaduz in 1939. Austria had also been annexed by Germany through the Anschluss in 1938.

After the Second World War, not only were the family's Czechoslovak properties expropriated, but in Allied-occupied Austria most of their properties were also located in the Soviet occupation zone and were therefore inaccessible until the end of the occupation in 1955. Due to the expropriations in Czechoslovakia as a result of the Beneš decrees in 1945, the family lost a large part of their land holdings, with about 1,200 square kilometers (463 square miles), 7.5 times the total area of the Principality itself. It was only able to restore its prosperity, including the upkeep of numerous castles in Austria and of the world-famous art collections, in the last quarter of the 20th century by expanding its small Liechtenstein bank into the internationally operating financial company LGT Group.

According to the Constitution of the Princely House of Liechtenstein of 26 October 1993, all members other than the reigning prince shall bear the titles of Prince or Princess of Liechtenstein and Count or Countess of Rietberg.

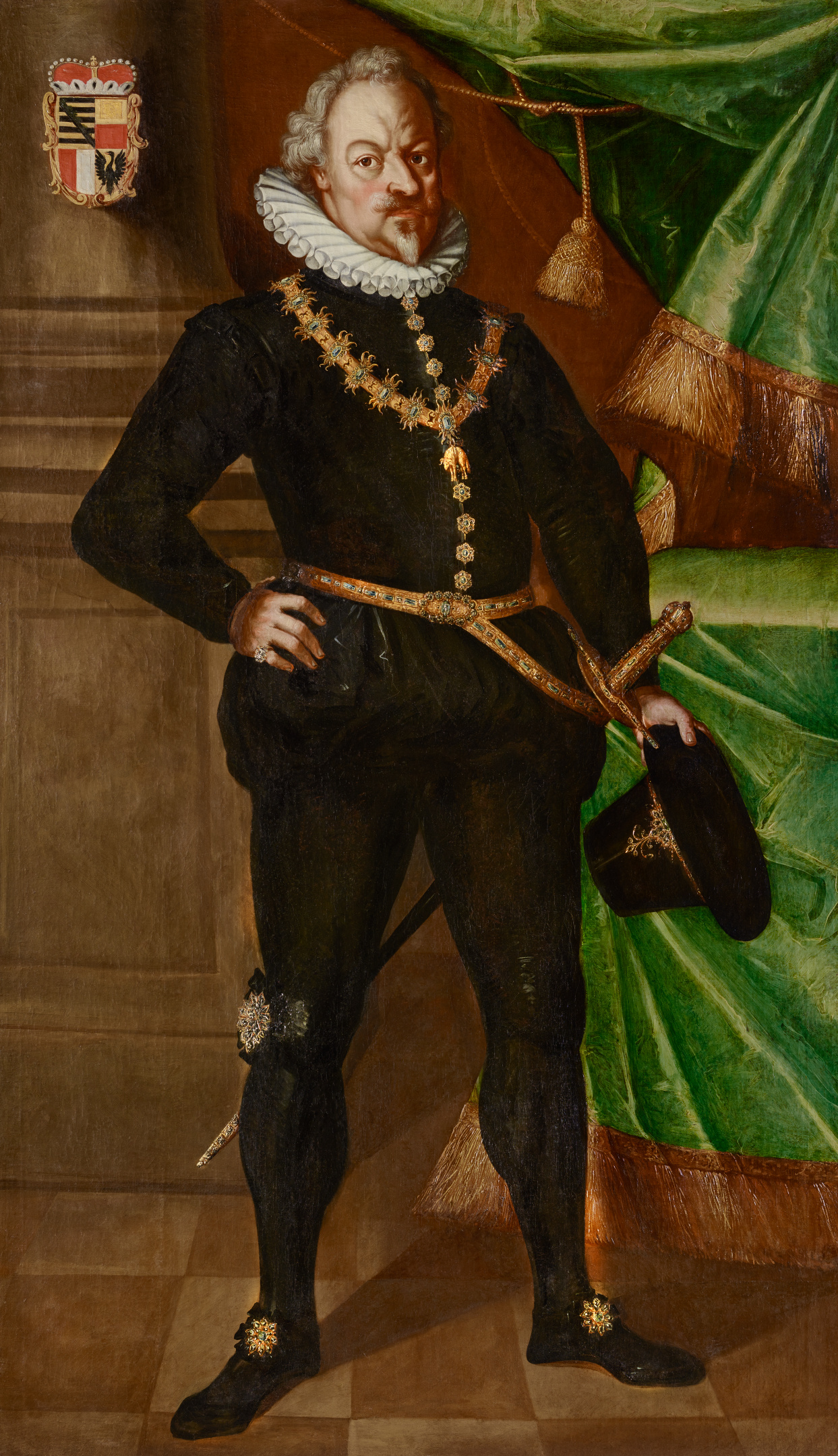
Karl I of Liechtenstein (1569–1627) created Prince in 1608, Viceroy of Bohemia 1622

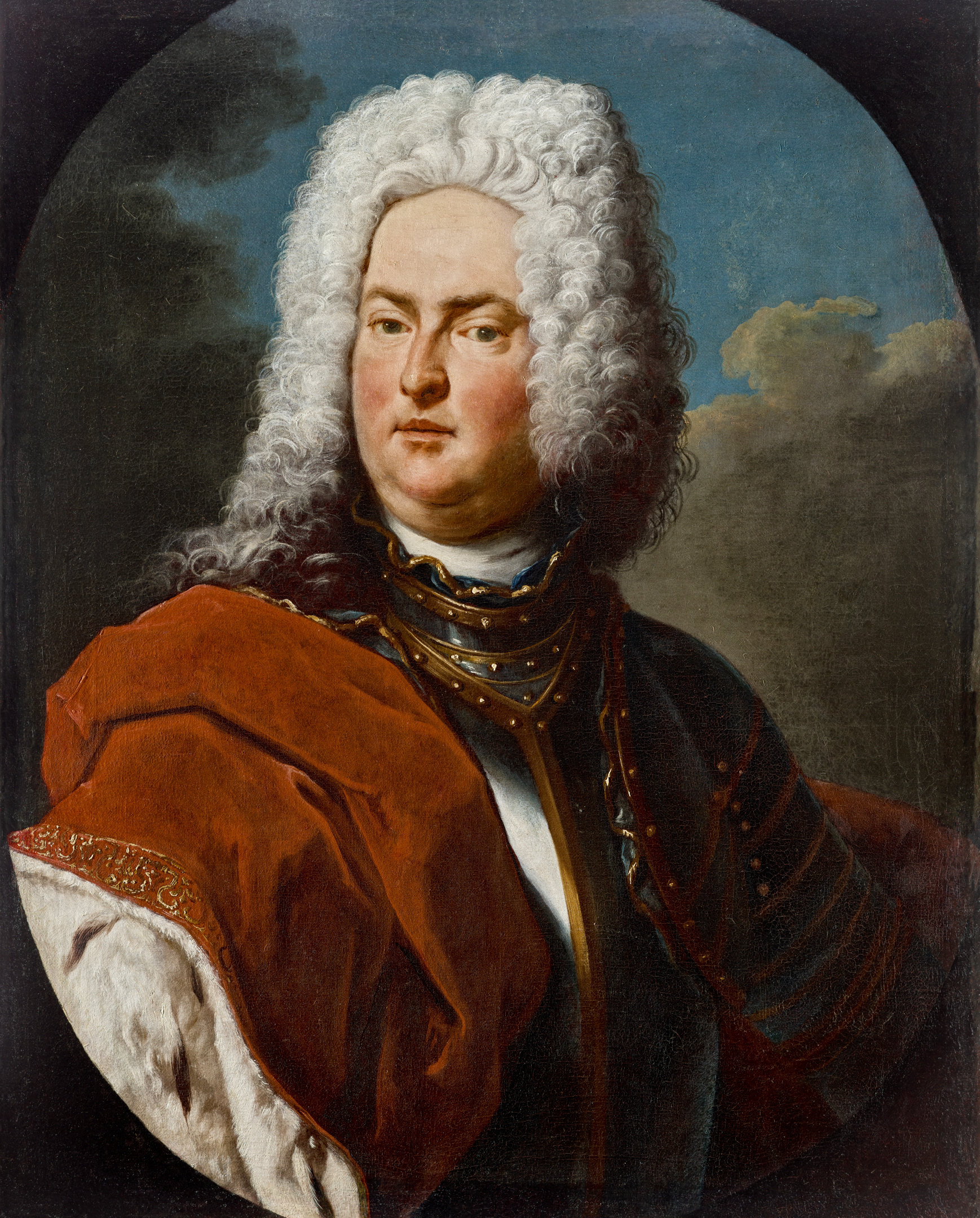
Prince Hans-Adam I (1662–1712) acquired the territory of the Principality

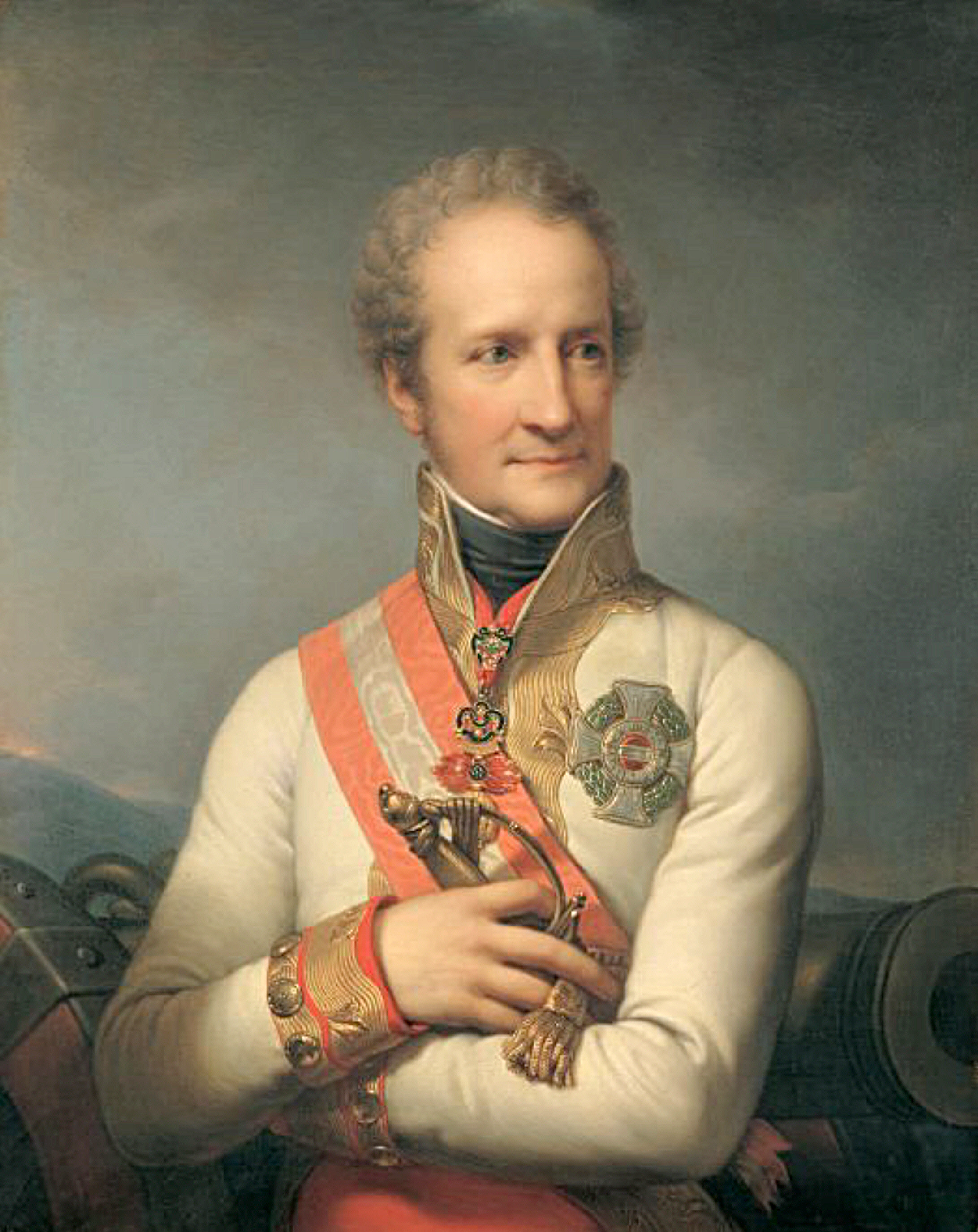
Johann I Joseph (1760–1836), the last prince to rule under the Holy Roman Empire and the first ruler of a sovereign state from 1806

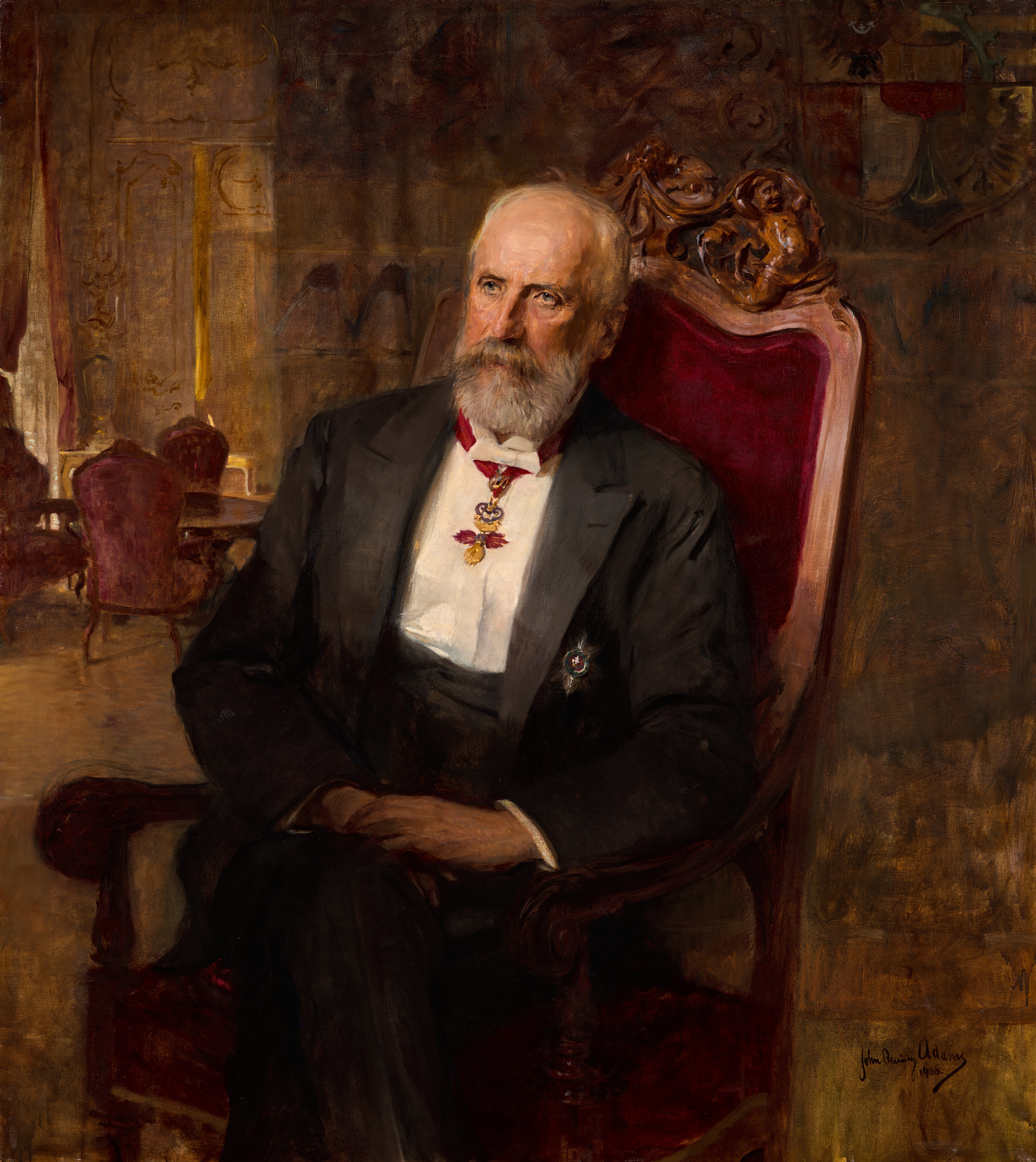
Prince Johann II (1840–1929) allied the principality with Switzerland after the downfall of the Habsburg monarchy in 1918

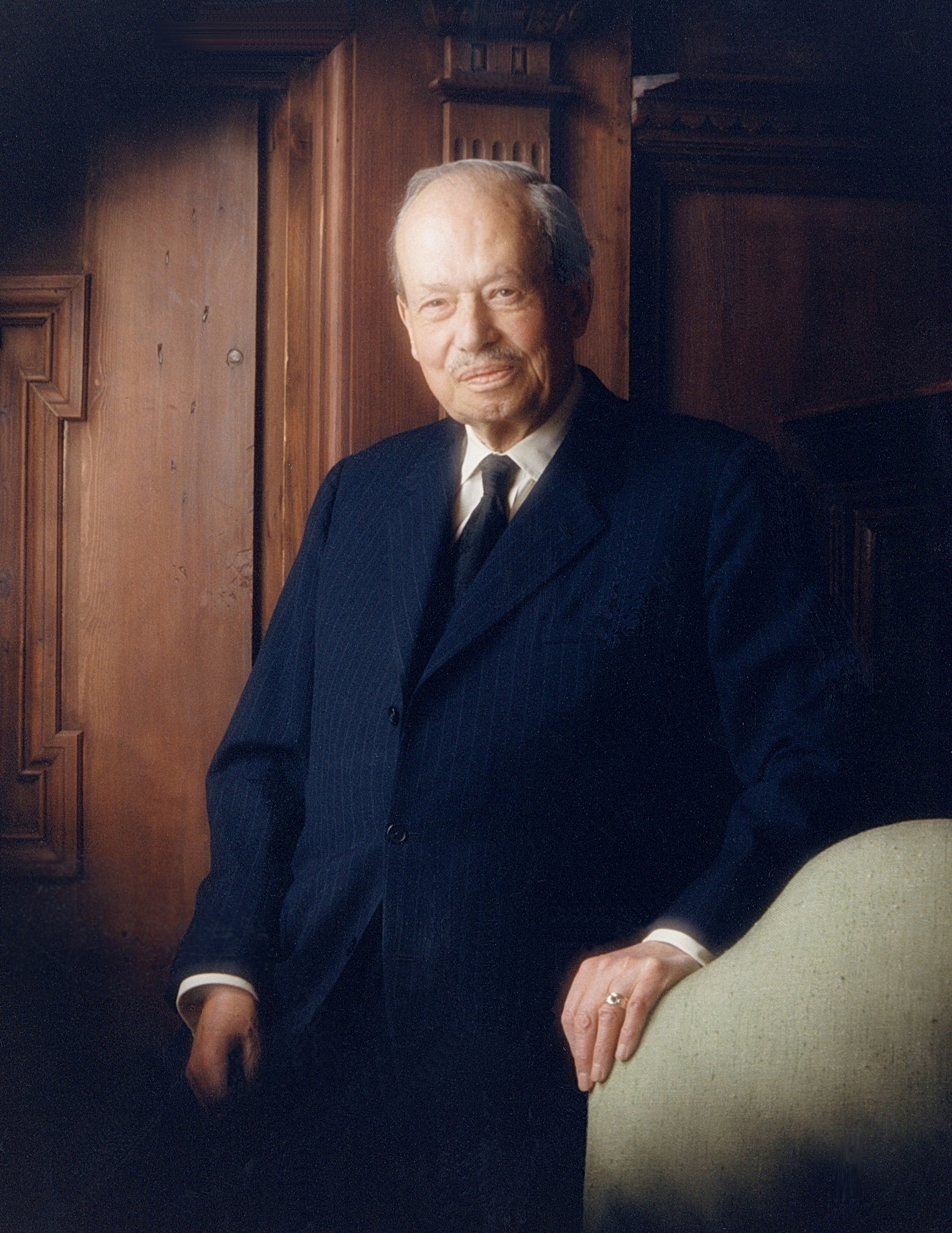
Prince Franz Joseph II (1906–1989) remained neutral throughout World War II

== Rulers ==
Partitions of Liechtenstein under the House of Liechtenstein

Counties of Vaduz and Schellenburg under House of Tübingen (1050-1416) and successors (1416-1712)	Lordship of Liechtenstein (1130-1608)
Lordship of Petronell (1209-1307)	Lordship of Rohrau (1209-1308)
Rohrau inherited by the Stadeck family
Lordship of Liechtenstein (1156-1608)	Lordship of Ravensperg (1350-1427)
Lordship of Nikolsburg (1427-1461)
Lordship of Feldsberg (1445-1585)
Lordship of Steyregg (1445-1548)
Feldsberg branch since 1585	Lordship of Wilfersdorf (1585-1709)
Raised to: Principality of Liechtenstein (1608–present)
End of the monarchy in Germany, Austria and Czechia (since 1918); Principality lost sovereignty over properties in these countries

Table of rulers

Ruler	Born	Reign	Ruling part	Consort	Death	Notes
Hugo I	c.1100 ?	1130 – 1150	Lordship of Liechtenstein	Unknown at least one child	c.1150 aged 49–50	Founder of the line of lords of Liechtenstein.
Dietrich I	c.1130 Son of Hugo I	1150 – 1192	Lordship of Liechtenstein	Virat of Pfaffstetten five children	1192 aged 61–62	
Dietrich II	c.1150 Son of Dietrich I and Virat of Pfaffstetten	1192 – 12 April 1209	Lordship of Liechtenstein	? of Guntramsdorf three children	12 April 1209 aged 58–59	
Henry I	c.1190 First son of Dietrich II	12 April 1209 – 11 May 1265	Lordship of Liechtenstein	Diemut one child Matilda five children	11 May 1265 aged 74–75	Children of Dietrich II, divided their inheritance.
Dietrich III	c.1190 Second son of Dietrich II	12 April 1209 – 1258	Lordship of Rohrau	Margaret at least one child	1258 aged 67–68	Children of Dietrich II, divided their inheritance.
Albert I	c.1200 Third son of Dietrich II	12 April 1209 – 1280	Lordship of Petronell	Unknown three children	1280 aged 79–80?	Children of Dietrich II, divided their inheritance.
Dietrich IV	c.1220 Son of Dietrich III and Margaret	1258 – 1278	Lordship of Rohrau	Diemutha of Faldenberg (d.1292); 1250 one child	1278 aged 57–58	
Frederick	c.1230? First son of Henry I and Matilda	11 May 1265 – 1310	Lordship of Liechtenstein	Agnes of Himperg one child	1310 aged 69–70?	Children of Henry I, ruled jointly. Frederick's namesake son, Frederick (II) predeceased him; the heirs were the sons of Henry II.
Henry II	c.1230? Second son of Henry I and Matilda	11 May 1265 – 13 April 1314	Lordship of Liechtenstein	Petrissa of Zelking (d.1318) two children	13 April 1314 aged 73–74?	Children of Henry I, ruled jointly. Frederick's namesake son, Frederick (II) predeceased him; the heirs were the sons of Henry II.
Hartneid I	c.1230? Third son of Henry I and Matilda	11 May 1265 – 1277	Lordship of Liechtenstein	Unmarried	1277 aged 46–47?	Children of Henry I, ruled jointly. Frederick's namesake son, Frederick (II) predeceased him; the heirs were the sons of Henry II.
Diemutha	c.1250 Daughter of Dietrich IV and Diemutha of Faldenberg	1278 – 25 January 1308	Lordship of Rohrau	Liutold, Lord of Stadeck (d.31 March 1295) c.1265 at least one child Ulrich I, Lord of Walsee (d.23 January 1329) c.1295 at least one child	25 January 1308 aged 57–58	Through her first marriage, Rohrau was passed to the Stadeck family.
Rohrau inherited by Stadeck family
Hugo II	c.1240 First son of Albert I	1280 – 1295	Lordship of Petronell	Unknown at least one child	1295 aged 54–55	Brothers, they are all named Lord of Petronell, which may indicate a co-rulership.
Albert II	c.1240 Second son of Albert	1280 – 1290	Lordship of Petronell	? of Wildungsmauer no children	1290 aged 49–50	Brothers, they are all named Lord of Petronell, which may indicate a co-rulership.
Peter	c.1240 Third son of Albert	1280 – 1285	Lordship of Petronell	Unmarried	c.1285 aged 44–45?	Brothers, they are all named Lord of Petronell, which may indicate a co-rulership.
Dietrich V	c.1260 Son of Hugo II	1295 – 1307	Lordship of Petronell	Unmarried	1307 aged 46–47	After his death Petronell returned to Liechtenstein.
Petronell returned to Liechtenstein
Hartneid II	c.1280? Son of Henry II and Petrissa of Zelking	13 April 1314 – 1350	Lordship of Liechtenstein	Agnes of Heinzel (d.1353) thirteen children	1350 aged 69–70?	
Henry III	c.1320? First son of Hartneid II and Agnes of Heinzel	1350 – 1369	Lordship of Liechtenstein	? of Walsee one child	1369 aged 48–49?	Children of Hartneid II, divided their inheritance. Anna's part was inherited by Kranichberg; John's part returned to Liechtenstein.
Hartneid III the Elder	c.1320? Fifth son of Hartneid II and Agnes of Heinzel	1350 – 1377	Lordship of Liechtenstein	Anna of Sternberg (d.1376) four children	1377 aged 56–57?	Children of Hartneid II, divided their inheritance. Anna's part was inherited by Kranichberg; John's part returned to Liechtenstein.
Henry IV the Younger	c.1320? Eighth son of Hartneid II and Agnes of Heinzel	1350 – 1383	Lordship of Liechtenstein	Unmarried	1383 aged 62–63?	Children of Hartneid II, divided their inheritance. Anna's part was inherited by Kranichberg; John's part returned to Liechtenstein.
John I	1335; Second son of Hartneid II and Agnes of Heinzel	1350 – 14 March 1397	Lordship of Liechtenstein (at Nikolsburg)	Agnes of Klingenberg (d.c.1385) one child Catharina of Pottendorf no children Elisabeth of Puchheim (d.1408) no children	14 March 1397; Mikulov aged 63–64	Children of Hartneid II, divided their inheritance. Anna's part was inherited by Kranichberg; John's part returned to Liechtenstein.
Anna	c.1320? Daughter of Hartneid II and Agnes of Heinzel	1350 – 13 February 1357	Lordship of Liechtenstein (at Petronell)	Siegfried, Lod of Kranichberg (d.1342) c.1300? at least one child	13 February 1357 aged 36–37?	Children of Hartneid II, divided their inheritance. Anna's part was inherited by Kranichberg; John's part returned to Liechtenstein.
Hartneid IV the Younger	c.1320? Seventh son of Hartneid II and Agnes of Heinzel	1350 – 1395	Lordship of Ravensperg	Afra of Walsee (d.1430) three children	1395 aged 74–75?	Children of Hartneid II, divided their inheritance. Anna's part was inherited by Kranichberg; John's part returned to Liechtenstein.
Christopher I	c.1350? Son of Henry III	1369 – 1413	Lordship of Liechtenstein	Barbara of Schenna no children	1413 aged 69–70?	Cousins, ruled jointly.
John II	c.1350? First son of Hartneid III and Anna of Sternberg	1369 – 1412	Lordship of Liechtenstein	Margaret of Capellen no children Agnes of Kuenring (d.c.1420) three children	1412 aged 69–70?	Cousins, ruled jointly.
Henry V	c.1350? Second son of Hartneid III and Anna of Sternberg	1369 – 1418	Lordship of Liechtenstein	Dorothea of Eckartsau six children Anna of Zelking (d.1448) no children	1418 aged 69–70?	Cousins, ruled jointly.
Hartneid V	c.1350? Son of Hartneid IV and Afra of Walsee	1395 – 1427	Lordship of Ravensperg	Dorothea of Capellen (d.1426) no children	1427 aged 76–77?	Left no children. Ravensperg returned to Liechtenstein.
Ravensperg returned to Liechtenstein
John III	c.1390? Son of John II and Agnes of Kuenring	1418 – 4 June 1427	Lordship of Liechtenstein	Hedwig of Pottendorf one child	4 June 1427 aged 36–37?	Left no male descendants. Liechtenstein passed to his cousins.
George I	c.1390 First son of Henry V and Dorothea of Eckartsau	4 June 1427 – 1444	Lordship of Liechtenstein	Hedwig of Pottendorf six children	1444 aged 53–54	Cousins of John III, divided the inheritance. George married the widow of his cousin.
Christopher II	c.1390? Second son of Henry V and Dorothea of Eckartsau	4 June 1427 – 22 June 1445	Lordship of Nikolsburg	Anna of Puchheim two children	22 June 1445 aged 54–55?	Cousins of John III, divided the inheritance. George married the widow of his cousin.
John IV	c.1430? First son of George I and Hedwig of Pottendorf	1444 – 1474	Lordship of Liechtenstein	Bertha of Rosenberg; October 1449 one child	1474; Vienna aged 53–54?	Children of George I; divided their inheritance.
Christopher III	c.1430? Third son of George I and Hedwig of Pottendorf	1444 – 1506	Lordship of Liechtenstein	Unknown c.1470 four children Amalia of Starhemberg (1450-1502); 1493 no children	1506 aged 75–76?	Children of George I; divided their inheritance.
Henry VI the Lame	c.1430? Second son of George I and Hedwig of Pottendorf	1444 – 1483	Lordship of Steyregg	Agnes of Starhemberg (1455-1501); 16 November 1473 four children	1483 aged 52–53?	Children of George I; divided their inheritance.
George II	c.1430? Fourth son of George I and Hedwig of Pottendorf	1444 – 1484	Lordship of Feldsberg	Agnes of Eckartsau two children	1484 aged 53–54?	Children of George I; divided their inheritance.
William	c.1430? First son of Christopher II and Anna of Puchheim	22 June 1445 – 12 August 1459	Lordship of Nikolsburg	Barbara Frangepan (d.1490) no children	12 August 1459; Selibice aged 28–29?	Left no surviving descendants, and Nikolsburg returned to Liechtenstein.
Nikolsburg returned to Liechtenstein
Regency of Agnes of Starhemberg (1483-1494)						
George III	1480; Son of Henry VI and Agnes of Starhemberg	1483 – 6 August 1548	Lordship of Steyregg	Magdalena of Polheim (1497-c.1525); 1518 four children	6 August 1548 aged 52–53?	
Hartmann I	c.1470? Son of George II and Agnes of Eckartsau	1484 – 1539	Lordship of Feldsberg	Amalia of Hohenlohe (d.1511); 1507 no children Johanna of Mainburg (d.1521) c.1510 three children	1539 aged 68–69?	
Wolfgang I	1473; Son of Christopher III and Amalia of Starhemberg	1506 – 1520	Lordship of Liechtenstein	Genowefa of Schaunberg (d.1519); 1498 four children	1520 aged 48–49	
John V	1500; Son of Wolfgang I and Genowefa of Schaunberg	1520 – 17 June 1552	Lordship of Liechtenstein	Anna of Liechtenstein-Steyregg; 1535 (annulled 1545?) six children Esther of Dietrichstein (4 July 1525 - 20 February 1597); 1543 three children	17 June 1552 aged 53–54?	
George Hartmann	1513; Son of Hartmann I and Johanna of Mainburg	1539 – 12 July 1562	Lordship of Feldsberg	Susanna of Liechtenstein-Steyregg (d.1595); 1542 thirteen children	12 July 1562 aged 48–49	
Anna	1523; Daughter of George III and Magdalena of Polheim	6 August 1548 – 1595	Lordship of Steyregg	John V, Lord of Liechtenstein; 1535 (annulled 1545?) six children	1595 aged 71–72?	Through he marriage, Steyregg returned to Liechtenstein.
Steyregg returned to Liechtenstein
George IV	1535; First son of John V and Anna of Liechtenstein-Steyregg	17 June 1552 – 1579	Lordship of Liechtenstein	Eleanor of Königsberg (1541-1591); 1559 no children	1579 aged 43–44?	Children of John V, ruled jointly. None of them left heirs, and Liechtenstein was inherited by Feldsberg branch.
Wolfgang II	1536; Second son of John V and Anna of Liechtenstein-Steyregg	17 June 1552 – 1585	Lordship of Liechtenstein	Benigna of Polheim (d.1588) no children	1585 aged 48–49	Children of John V, ruled jointly. None of them left heirs, and Liechtenstein was inherited by Feldsberg branch.
Hartmann II	6 April/May 1544; Valtice; Son of George Hartmann and Susanna of Liechtenstein-Steyregg	12 July 1562 – 11 October 1585	Lordship of Feldsberg	Anna Maria of Ortenburg; 28 October 1568; Neu-Ortenburg Castle nine children	11 October 1585; Lednice aged 41	
Charles	30 July 1569; Valtice; First son of Hartmann II, Lord of Liechtenstein-Feldsberg and Anna Maria of Ortenburg	11 October 1585 – 12 February 1627	Lordship of Liechtenstein (as Prince)	Anna Maria Šemberová of Boskovice and Černá Hora; 1590 five children	12 February 1627; Prague aged 57	In 1585, reunited his family patrimony, but re-divided it again. In 1608, the brothers were titled Prince, but this title was empty, as none of their holdings ever held the dignity of Principality. In fact they remained as lords of their estates. Maximilian's estates were inherited by Charles's son Charles Eusebius.
Maximilian I	6 November 1578; Lednice; Second son of Hartmann II, Lord of Liechtenstein-Feldsberg and Anna Maria of Ortenburg	11 October 1585 – 29 April 1645	Lordship of Liechtenstein (in Rabensburg and Hohenau an der March; as Prince)	Catherine Šemberová of Boskovice and Černá Hora; 1597 no children	29 April 1645; Győr aged 66	In 1585, reunited his family patrimony, but re-divided it again. In 1608, the brothers were titled Prince, but this title was empty, as none of their holdings ever held the dignity of Principality. In fact they remained as lords of their estates. Maximilian's estates were inherited by Charles's son Charles Eusebius.
Gundakar	30 January 1580; Lednice; Third son of Hartmann II, Lord of Liechtenstein-Feldsberg and Anna Maria of Ortenburg	11 October 1585 – 5 August 1658	Lordship of Wilfersdorf (as Prince)	Agnes of East Frisia; 29 March 1604; Prague seven children Elizabeth Lucretia, Duchess of Cieszyn; 23 April 1618 three children	5 August 1658; Wilfersdorf Castle aged 78	In 1585, reunited his family patrimony, but re-divided it again. In 1608, the brothers were titled Prince, but this title was empty, as none of their holdings ever held the dignity of Principality. In fact they remained as lords of their estates. Maximilian's estates were inherited by Charles's son Charles Eusebius.
Regency of Maximilian I, Prince of Liechtenstein-Rabensburg and Gundakar, Prince of Liechtenstein-Wilfersdorf (1627-1632)						
Charles Eusebius	11 April 1611; Valtice; Son of Charles and Anna Maria Šemberová of Boskovice and Černá Hora}	12 February 1627 – 5 April 1684	Lordship of Liechtenstein (as Prince)	Johanna Beatrix of Dietrichstein; 6 August 1644; Vienna five children	5 April 1684; Kostelec nad Černými lesy aged 72	
Hartmann III	9 January 1613; Vienna; Son of Gundakar and Agnes of East Frisia	5 August 1658 – 11 February 1686	Lordship of Wilfersdorf (as Prince)	Sidonia Elisabeth of Salm-Reifferscheidt; 27 October 1640; Koln twenty-three children	11 February 1686; Wilfersdorf Castle aged 73	
Hans-Adam I the Rich	16 August 1662; Brno; Son of Charles Eusebius and Johanna Beatrix of Dietrichstein	5 April 1684 – 16 June 1712	Lordship of Liechtenstein (as Prince; with the Lordships of Schellenberg since 1699, and Vaduz since 1712)	Erdmuthe Maria Theresia of Dietrichstein; 16 February 1681; Vienna seven children	16 June 1712; Vienna aged 49	On 18 January 1699 he acquired the seigneury of Schellenberg, and on 22 February 1712 the county of Vaduz. These two domains would later form the present principality of Liechtenstein.
Maximilian II	25 July 1641; Wilfersdorf Castle; First son of Hartmann III and Sidonia Elisabeth of Salm-Reifferscheidt	11 February 1686 – 21 April 1709	Lordship of Wilfersdorf (as Prince)	Johanna Beatrice of Liechtenstein; 29 April 1669; Wilfersdorf Castle two children Eleonora Margaret of Sonderburg-Wiesenburg; 1 October 1673; Wilfersdorf Castle two children Maria Elisabeth of Liechtenstein; 30 October 1702; Wilfersdorf Castle four children	21 April 1709; Český Krumlov aged 67	Left no descendants. He was succeeded by his brother.
Anton Florian	28 May 1656; Wilfersdorf; Second son of Hartmann III and Sidonia Elisabeth of Salm-Reifferscheidt	21 April 1709 – 16 June 1712	Lordship of Wilfersdorf (as Prince)	Eleonore Barbara von Thun und Hohenstein; 15 October 1679; Krupka eleven children	11 October 1721; Vienna aged 65	Heirs of Hans-Adam I. Maria Theresa inherited the duchy of Opava from her father and, as she survived her offspring, Opava returned to Liechtenstein after her death. The same happened for Maria Elisabeth. As for Anton Florian, he was the heir of his brother in Wilfersdorf, and eventually inherited the majority of Liechtenstein family's estates. However, Hans-Adam left the core of today's Liechtenstein to another heir: Joseph Wenzel (16 June 1712 – 12 March 1718), heir of Schellenberg and Vaduz. This nomination was against the family inheritance settlement of 1606, and Joseph Wenzel eventually returned these properties to Anton Florian in exchange for the Lordship of Rumburk.; In 1719, after settling he inheritance question, Anton Florian was rewarded with the Principality of Liechtenstein, created by Charles VI, Holy Roman Emperor with the fusion of Schellenberg and Vaduz.
Anton Florian	28 May 1656; Wilfersdorf; Second son of Hartmann III and Sidonia Elisabeth of Salm-Reifferscheidt	16 June 1712 – 11 October 1721	Lordship of Liechtenstein (as Prince; with Schellenberg and Vaduz since 1718) Principality of Liechtenstein (since 23 January 1719)	Eleonore Barbara von Thun und Hohenstein; 15 October 1679; Krupka eleven children	11 October 1721; Vienna aged 65	
Maria Elisabeth	8 May 1683; Vienna; First daughter of Hans-Adam I and Erdmuthe Maria Theresia of Dietrichstein	16 June 1712 – 8 May 1744	Lordship of Liechtenstein (as Princess; in Göding, Fryšava pod Žákovou horou, Bonitz, Kyjovice and Jaroslavice)	Maximilian II, Prince of Liechtenstein-Wilfersdorf; 30 October 1702; Wilfersdorf Castle four children Leopold, Duke of Schleswig-Holstein-Sonderburg-Wiesenburg; 3 May 1715; Lemgo five children	8 May 1744; Vienna aged 61	
Maria Theresa	11 May 1694; Vienna; Fourth daughter of Hans-Adam I and Erdmuthe Maria Theresia of Dietrichstein	16 June 1712 – 20 February 1772	Lordship of Liechtenstein (as Princess; in the Duchy of Opava)	Thomas Emmanuel of Savoy, Count of Soissons; 24 October 1713; Vienna one child	20 February 1772; Vienna aged 77	
Joseph Johann Adam	25 May 1690; Vienna; Son of Anton Florian and Eleonore Barbara von Thun und Hohenstein	11 October 1721 – 17 December 1732	Principality of Liechtenstein	Maria Gabriella of Liechtenstein; 1 December 1712; Vienna one child Marianna of Thun and Hohenstein; 3 February 1716; Vienna no children Maria Anna of Oettingen-Spielberg; 3 August 1716; Vienna five children Maria Anna Kottulinsky; 22 August 1729; Głogów two children	16 June 1712; Valtice aged 42	
Regency of Joseph Wenzel of Liechtenstein (1732-1745)						Left no surviving male children. The principality went to his aunt and uncle.
Johann Nepomuk Charles	8 July 1724; Vienna; Son of Joseph Johann Adam and Maria Anna of Oettingen-Spielberg	17 December 1732 – 22 December 1748	Principality of Liechtenstein	Maria Josepha von Harrach; 19 March 1744; Vienna three children	22 December 1748; Vyškov aged 20	Left no surviving male children. The principality went to his aunt and uncle.
Anna Maria	11 September 1699; Vienna; Daughter of Anton Florian and Eleonore Barbara von Thun und Hohenstein	22 December 1748 – 20 January 1753	Principality of Liechtenstein (suo jure heiress)	Johann Ernst of Thun-Hohenstein (1694–1717); 1716; Vienna no children Joseph Wenzel I 19 April 1718; Vienna five children	20 January 1753; Vienna aged 53	Spouses, inherited the principality. She was sister of Joseph Johann Adam, and heir of her nephew John Nepomuk, He was a nephew of Anton Florian and, after ruling for a brief period the lordships of Schellanberg and Vaduz, and being regent for John Nepomuk, finally takes full possession of all the family's property. However, the couple didn't have surviving offspring; the principality went to their nephew, son of Joseph Wenzel's brother.
Joseph Wenzel I	9 August 1696; Prague; Son of Philip Erasmus of Liechtenstein-Wilfersdorf and Christina Theresa of Löwenstein-Wertheim-Rochefort	22 December 1748 – 10 February 1772	Principality of Liechtenstein	Anna Maria; 19 April 1718; Vienna five children	10 February 1772; Vienna aged 75	Spouses, inherited the principality. She was sister of Joseph Johann Adam, and heir of her nephew John Nepomuk, He was a nephew of Anton Florian and, after ruling for a brief period the lordships of Schellanberg and Vaduz, and being regent for John Nepomuk, finally takes full possession of all the family's property. However, the couple didn't have surviving offspring; the principality went to their nephew, son of Joseph Wenzel's brother.
Franz Joseph I	19 November 1726; Milan; Son of Emanuel of Liechtenstein and Anna Antonia of Dietrichstein-Weichselstädt	10 February 1772 – 18 August 1781	Principality of Liechtenstein	Leopoldine of Sternberg; 6 July 1750; Valtice eight children	18 August 1781; Metz aged 54	Nephew of Joseph Wenzel.
Aloys I	14 May 1759; Vienna; First son of Franz Joseph I and Leopoldine of Sternberg	18 August 1781 – 24 March 1805	Principality of Liechtenstein	Karoline of Manderscheid-Blankenheim; 15 November 1783; Valtice no children	24 March 1805; Vienna aged 45	Left no children. The principality was inherited by his brother.
Johann I Joseph	26 June 1760; Vienna; Second son of Franz Joseph I and Leopoldine of Sternberg	24 March 1805 – 29 April 1836	Principality of Liechtenstein	Josepha of Fürstenberg-Weitra; 12 April 1792; Vienna fourteen children	20 April 1836; Vienna aged 75	
Aloys II	25 May 1796; Vienna; Son of Johann I Joseph and Josepha of Fürstenberg-Weitra	29 April 1836 – 12 May 1858	Principality of Liechtenstein	Franziska Kinsky of Wchinitz and Tettau; 8 August 1831; Vienna eleven children	12 May 1858; Lednice aged 54	
Johann II the Good	5 October 1840; Lednice; First son of Aloys II and Franziska Kinsky of Wchinitz and Tettau	12 May 1858 – 11 February 1929	Principality of Liechtenstein	Unmarried	11 February 1929; Valtice aged 88	Left no children. The principality passed to his brother.
Franz I	28 August 1853; Liechtenstein Castle; Second son of Aloys II and Franziska Kinsky of Wchinitz and Tettau	11 February 1929 – 25 July 1938	Principality of Liechtenstein	Elisabeth von Gutmann; 22 July 1929; Lainz, near Vienna eight children	25 July 1938; Valtice aged 84	
Regency of Franz Joseph of Liechtenstein (March–July 1938)
Franz Joseph II	16 August 1906; Frauenthal Castle; Son of Aloys of Liechtenstein and Elisabeth Amalie of Austria	25 July 1938 – 13 November 1989	Principality of Liechtenstein	Georgina von Wilczek; 7 March 1943; Vaduz Cathedral five children	13 November 1989; Grabs aged 83	Cousin of Franz I, as grandson of Henriette (sister of Johann II and Franz I) and Alfred (himself grandson of Johann I Joseph). Became heir and regent early in 1938.
Regency of Hans-Adam of Liechtenstein (1984-1989)						Cousin of Franz I, as grandson of Henriette (sister of Johann II and Franz I) and Alfred (himself grandson of Johann I Joseph). Became heir and regent early in 1938.
Hans-Adam II	14 February 1945; Milan; Son of Franz Joseph II and Georgina von Wilczek	13 November 1989 – present	Principality of Liechtenstein	Marie Aglaë Kinsky von Wchinitz und Tettau; 30 July 1967; Vaduz Cathedral four children	Living	
Regency of Alois of Liechtenstein (2004-present)

== 21st-century princely family ==
Styles of Princes(ses) of Liechtenstein
- Reference style: His/Her Serene Highness
- Spoken style: Your Serene Highness

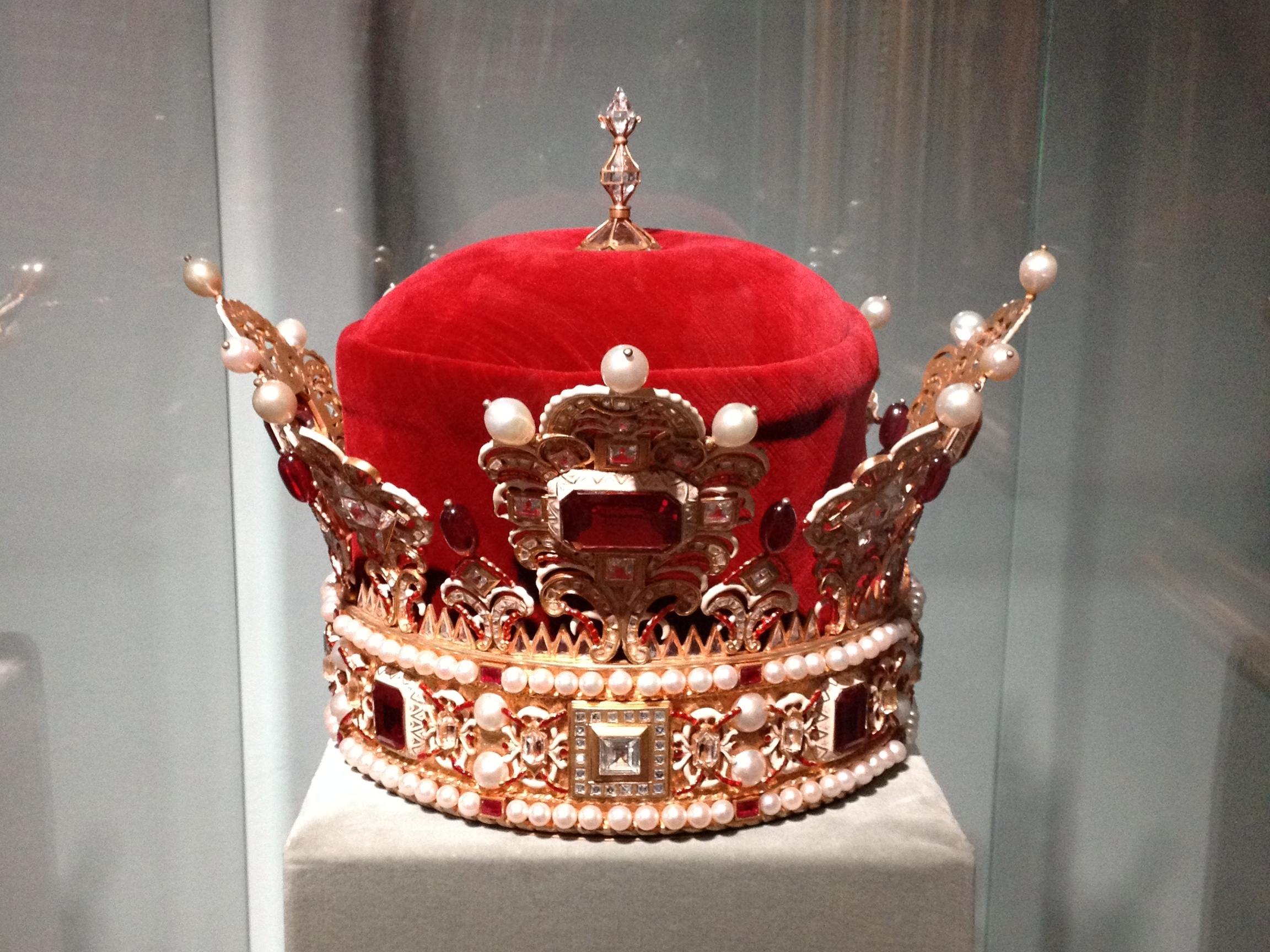
Ducal hat of Liechtenstein

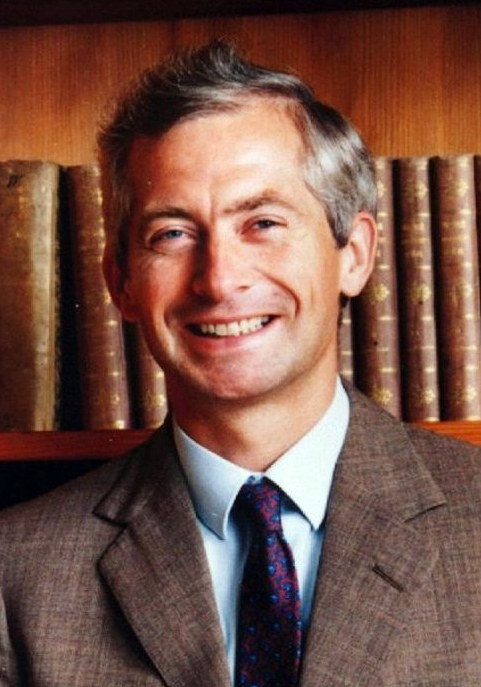
Hans-Adam II, Prince of Liechtenstein (born 1945), current head of the house and sovereign ruler of the principality

- The Prince (the monarch)
  - The Hereditary Prince and Hereditary Princess (the Prince's son and daughter-in-law)
    - Prince Joseph Wenzel (the Prince's grandson)
    - Princess Marie Caroline (the Prince's granddaughter)
    - Prince Georg (the Prince's grandson)
    - Prince Nikolaus (the Prince's grandson)
  - Prince Maximilian and Princess Angela (the Prince's son and daughter-in-law)
    - Prince Alfons (the Prince's grandson)
  - Princess Marie (the Prince's daughter-in-law)
    - Prince Moritz (the Prince's grandson)
    - Princess Georgina (the Prince's granddaughter)
    - Prince Benedikt (the Prince's grandson)
  - Princess Tatjana (the Prince's daughter)
- Prince Philipp and Princess Isabelle (the Prince's brother and sister-in-law)
  - Prince Alexander and Princess Astrid (the Prince's nephew and niece-in-law)
    - Princess Theodora (the Prince's great-niece)
  - Prince Wenzeslaus (the Prince's nephew)
  - Prince Rudolf and Princess Tılsım (the Prince's nephew and niece-in-law)
    - Princess Alienor Faye (the Prince's great-niece)
    - Princess Laetitia (the Prince's great-niece)
    - Prince Karl Ludwig (the Prince's great-nephew)
- Prince Nikolaus and Princess Margaretha (the Prince's brother and sister-in-law)
  - Princess Maria-Anunciata (the Prince's niece)
  - Princess Marie-Astrid (the Prince's niece)
  - Prince Josef-Emanuel and Princess María Claudia (the Prince's nephew and niece-in-law)
    - Prince Leopold (the Prince's great-nephew)
    - Prince Nikolai (the Prince's great-nephew)
- The Dowager Marchioness of Mariño (the Prince's sister)
- Prince Andreas and Princess Silvia (the Prince's first cousin and first cousin in-law)
  - Prince Stefan (the Prince's first cousin once removed)
  - Prince Christian (the Prince's first cousin once removed)
  - Prince Emanuel (the Prince's first cousin once removed)
- Prince Gregor (the Prince's first cousin)
- Princess Maria-Pia of Liechtenstein (the Prince's first cousin)
- Princess Katharina of Liechtenstein (the Prince's first cousin)
- Princess Birgitta of Liechtenstein (the Prince's first cousin)
- Princess Maria Elisabeth (the Prince's first cousin)
- Prince Hubertus Alois (the Prince's first cousin)
  - Prince Leopold (the Prince's first cousin once removed)
- Princess Marie Therese Eleonore (the Prince's first cousin)
  - Prince Alfred Paolo and Princess Alice Stori (the Prince's second cousin once removed and wife)
    - Princess Emilia Laura (the Prince's second cousin twice-removed)
    - Prince Franz Cosimo (the Prince's second cousin twice-removed)
    - Princess Giulia Marina (the Prince's second cousin twice-removed)
  - Prince Lukas Wolfgang and Princess Nathalie (the Prince's second cousin once-removed and wife)
    - Princess Nora Manureva (the Prince's second cousin twice-removed)
    - Princess Lucie Louise (the Prince's second cousin twice-removed)
  - Princess Livia Margherita (the Prince's second cousin once-removed)
- Princess Annemarie (the Prince's second cousin's widow)
  - Prince Emanuel and Princess Sonja Maria (the Prince's second cousin once-removed and wife)
    - Prince Leopold (the Prince's second cousin twice-removed)
    - Prince Heinrich (the Prince's second cousin twice-removed)
    - Princess Charlotte (the Prince's second cousin twice-removed)
  - Prince Ulrich (the Prince's second cousin once-removed)
- Prince Anton and Princess Rosmarie (the Prince's second cousin and wife)
  - Princess Ludmilla (the Prince's second cousin once-removed)
  - Prince Georg Clemens (the Prince's second cousin once-removed)
- Prince Eugen and Princess Maria Theresia (the Prince's second cousin and wife)
  - Prince Johannes and Princess Kinga (the Prince's second cousin once-removed and wife)
  - Princess Anna Theodora Maria (the Prince's second cousin once-removed)
  - Princess Marie Ileana Josefa (the Prince's second cousin once-removed)
- Prince Albrecht Johannes (the Prince's second cousin)
  - Prince Albrecht Johannes Christoph (the Prince's second cousin once-removed)
  - Princess Lorenza (the Prince's second cousin once-removed)
- Princess Barbara Eleonora Marie of Yugoslavia (the Prince's second cousin)
- Princess Monica Maria Theresia Elisabeth (the Prince's second cousin)
- Princess Clotilde (the Prince's first cousin once-removed's widow)
- Princess Diemut Margarete Maria (the Prince's second cousin)
- Prince Gundakar and Princess Marie (the Prince's second cousin and second cousin-in-law)
  - Princess Leopoldine (the Prince's second cousin once-removed)
  - Princess Marie Immaculée (the Prince's second cousin once-removed)
  - Prince Johann and Princess Felicitas (the Prince's second cousin once-removed and wife)
    - Princess Josefine (the Prince's second cousin twice-removed)
  - Princess Margarete (the Prince's second cousin once-removed)
  - Prince Gabriel (the Prince's second cousin once-removed)
- Prince Alfred Heinrich and Princess Raffaella (the Prince's second cousin and wife)
- Princess Adelgunde Maria Anna Therese (the Prince's second cousin)
- Prince Karl Emmeran (the Prince's second cousin)
- Princess Maria Eleonore (the Prince's second cousin)
- Prince Hugo Karl August (the Prince's second cousin)
  - Princess Maria Aurelia Margarethe (the Prince's second cousin once-removed)
- Princess Roberta (the Prince's second cousin's widow)
  - Princess Adelheid, Countess von Coudenhove-Kalergi (the Prince's second cousin once-removed)
  - Princess Hedwig, Countess de Quélen Cansou (the Prince's second cousin once-removed)
- Prince Michael Karl and Princess Hildegard (the Prince's second cousin and wife)
  - Princess Therese Maria (the Prince's second cousin once-removed)
  - Princess Gisela Maria (the Prince's second cousin once-removed)
- Princess Charlotte (the Prince's second cousin)
- Prince Christof (the Prince's second cousin)
- Prince Karl Maria (the Prince's second cousin)
  - Prince Stefan and Princess Florentine (the Prince's fifth cousin once-removed and fifth cousin-in-law once-removed)
  - Prince Lukas (the Prince's fifth cousin twice-removed)
  - Prince Konrad (the Prince's fifth cousin twice-removed)
  - Princess Anna (the Prince's fifth cousin twice-removed)
  - Princess Rita (the Prince's fifth cousin twice-removed)

== Tree list ==
Below are all male and male-line dynastic descendants of Johann I Joseph of Liechtenstein. The numbers represent the positions in the line of succession.

- Prince Johann I Josef (1760–1836)
  - Prince Alois II (1796–1858)
    - Prince Johann II (1840–1929)
    - Prince Franz I (1853–1938)
  - Prince Franz de Paula (1802–1887)
    - Prince Alfred (1842–1907)
      - Prince Franz (1868–1929)
      - Prince Alois (1869–1955)
        - Prince Franz Josef II (1906–1989)
          - Prince Hans-Adam II (born 1945)
            - (1) Hereditary Prince Alois (born 1968)
              - (2) Prince Joseph Wenzel (born 1995)
              - (3) Prince Georg (born 1999)
              - (4) Prince Nikolaus (born 2000)
            - (5) Prince Maximilian (born 1969)
              - (6) Prince Alfons (born 2001)
            - Prince Constantin (1972–2023)
              - (7) Prince Moritz (born 2003)
              - (8) Prince Benedikt (born 2008)
          - (9) Prince Philipp (born 1946)
            - (10) Prince Alexander (born 1972)
            - (11) Prince Wenzeslaus (born 1974)
            - (12) Prince Rudolf (born 1975)
              - (13) Prince Karl Ludwig (born 2016)
          - (14) Prince Nikolaus (born 1947)
            - Prince Leopold (1984)
            - (15) Prince Josef-Emanuel (born 1989)
              - (16) Prince Leopold (born 2023)
              - (17) Prince Nikolai (born 2025)
          - Prince Franz Josef "Wenzel" (1962–1991)
        - Prince Karl Alfred (1910–1985)
          - Prince Dominik (1950–2009)
          - (18) Prince Andreas (born 1952)
          - (19) Prince Gregor (born 1954)
        - Prince Georg Hartmann (1911–1998)
          - (20) Prince Christoph (born 1958)
        - Prince Ulrich Dietmar (1913–1978)
        - Prince Alois Heinrich (1917–1967)
        - Prince Heinrich Hartneid (1920–1993)
          - (21) Prince Hubertus (born 1971)
      - Prince Johannes (1873–1959)
        - Prince Alfred (1907–1991)
          - Prince Franz (1935–2026)
            - (22) Prince Alfred (born 1972)
              - (23) Prince Franz (born 2009)
            - (24) Prince Lukas (born 1974)
          - Prince Friedrich (1937–2010)
            - (25) Prince Emanuel (born 1978)
              - (26) Prince Leopold (born 2010)
              - (27) Prince Heinrich (born 2012)
            - (28) Prince Ulrich (born 1983)
          - (29) Prince Anton (born 1940)
            - (30) Prince Georg (born 1977)
        - Prince Emanuel (1908–1987)
        - Prince Johannes (1910–1975)
          - (31) Prince Eugen (born 1939)
            - (32) Prince Johannes (born 1969)
          - Prince Albrecht (1940–2017) (took the title of Baron von Lanškroun)
        - Prince Constantin (1911–2001)
      - Prince Alfred Roman (1875–1930)
        - Prince Hans-Moritz (1914–2004)
          - (33) Prince Gundakar (born 1949)
            - (34) Prince Johann (born 1993)
            - (35) Prince Gabriel (born 1998)
          - (36) Prince Alfred (born 1951)
          - (37) Prince Karl (born 1955)
          - (38) Prince Hugo (born 1964)
        - Prince Heinrich (1916–1991)
          - Prince Vincenz (1950–2008)
          - (39) Prince Michael (born 1951)
          - (40) Prince Christof (born 1956)
          - (41) Prince Karl (born 1957)
      - Prince Heinrich (1877–1915)
      - Prince Karl Aloys (1878–1955)
        - Prince Wilhelm (1922–2006) (took the title of Graf von Hohenau), restored his title in 1980
          - (42) Prince Heinrich (born 1964)
        - (43) Prince Wolfgang (born 1934)
          - (44) Prince Leopold (born 1978)
            - (45) Prince Lorenz (born 2012)
      - Prince Georg (Pater Ildefons, O.S.B.) (1880–1931)
    - Prince Aloys (1846–1920)
    - Prince Heinrich (1853–1914)
  - Prince Karl Johann (1803–1871)
    - Prince Rudolf (1833–1888)
    - Prince Philipp (1837–1901)
      - Prince Karl (1862–1893)
      - Prince Joseph (1863)
  - Prince Friedrich (1807–1885)
  - Prince Eduard Franz (1809–1864)
    - Prince Aloys (1840–1885)
      - Prince Friedrich (1871–1959)
        - Prince Aloys (1898–1943)
          - Prince Luitpold (1940–2016)
            - Prince Friedrich (1970)
            - (46) Prince Carl (born 1978)
        - Prince Alfred (1900–1972)
          - Prince Alexander (1929–2012)
            - (47) Prince Christian (born 1961)
              - (48) Prince Augustinus (born 1992)
              - (49) Prince Johannes (born 1995)
            - (51) Prince Stefan (born 1961)
              - (52) Prince Lukas (born 1990)
              - (53) Prince Konrad (born 1992)
            - (54) Prince Emanuel (born 1964)
              - (55) Prince Josef (born 1998)
          - Prince Franz de Paula (1935–1987)
        - Prince Alexander (1901–1926)
      - Prince Eduard (1872–1951)
        - Prince Johannes (1899–1979)
        - Prince Ferdinand (1901–1981)
  - Prince August (1810–1824)
  - Prince Rudolf (1816–1848)

== Palaces and residences ==
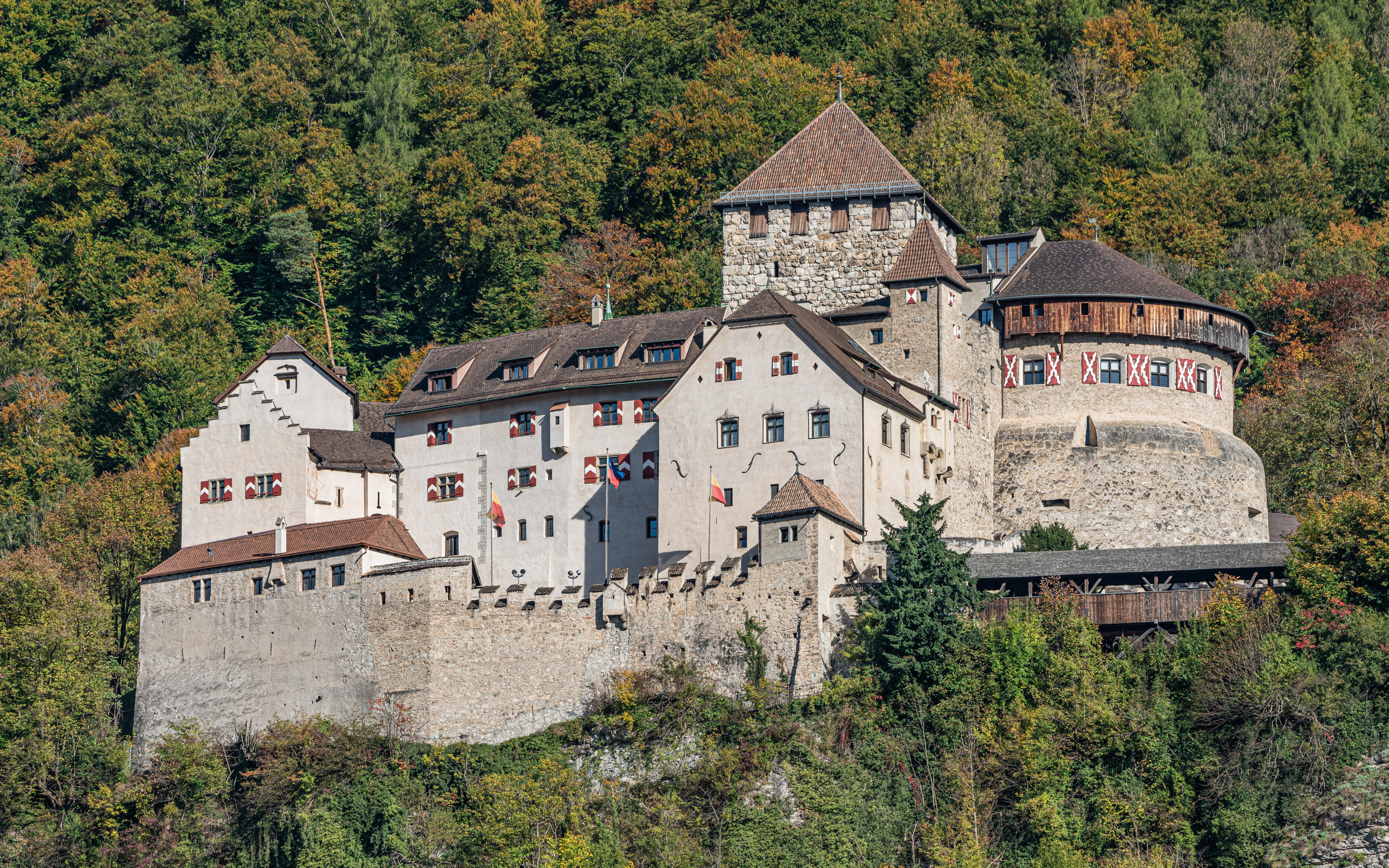
Vaduz Castle, the Sovereign's residence in the Principality of Liechtenstein

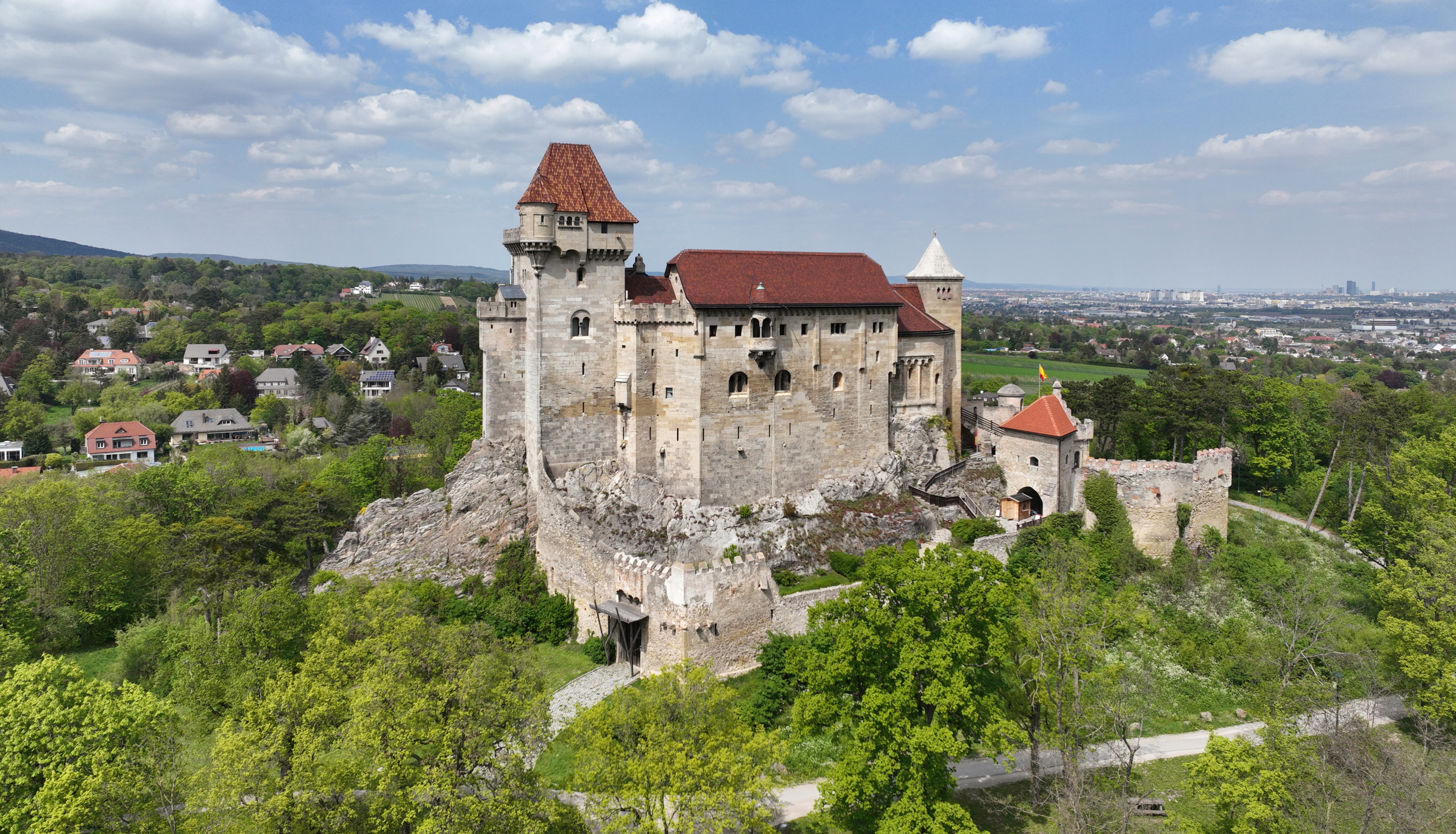
Liechtenstein Castle in Lower Austria, ancestral seat, now family museum

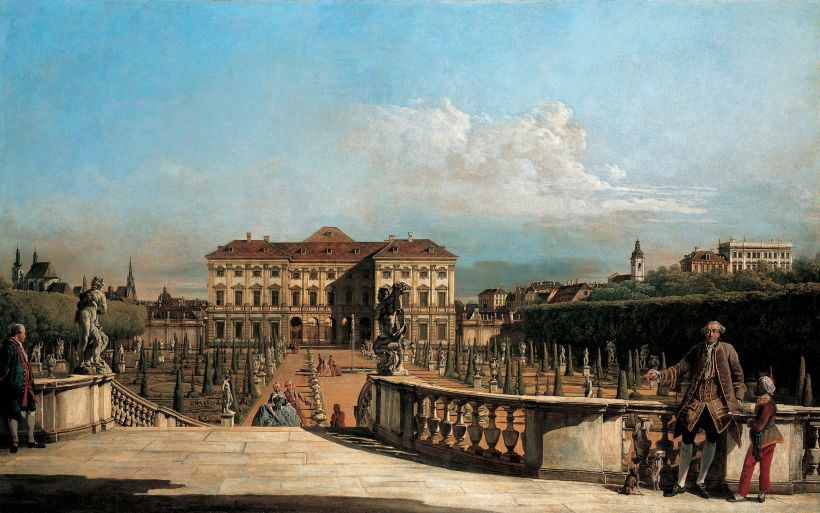
Liechtenstein Garden Palace in Vienna (painted by Bellotto 1759/60), now home to the princely 16th to 18th century art collection

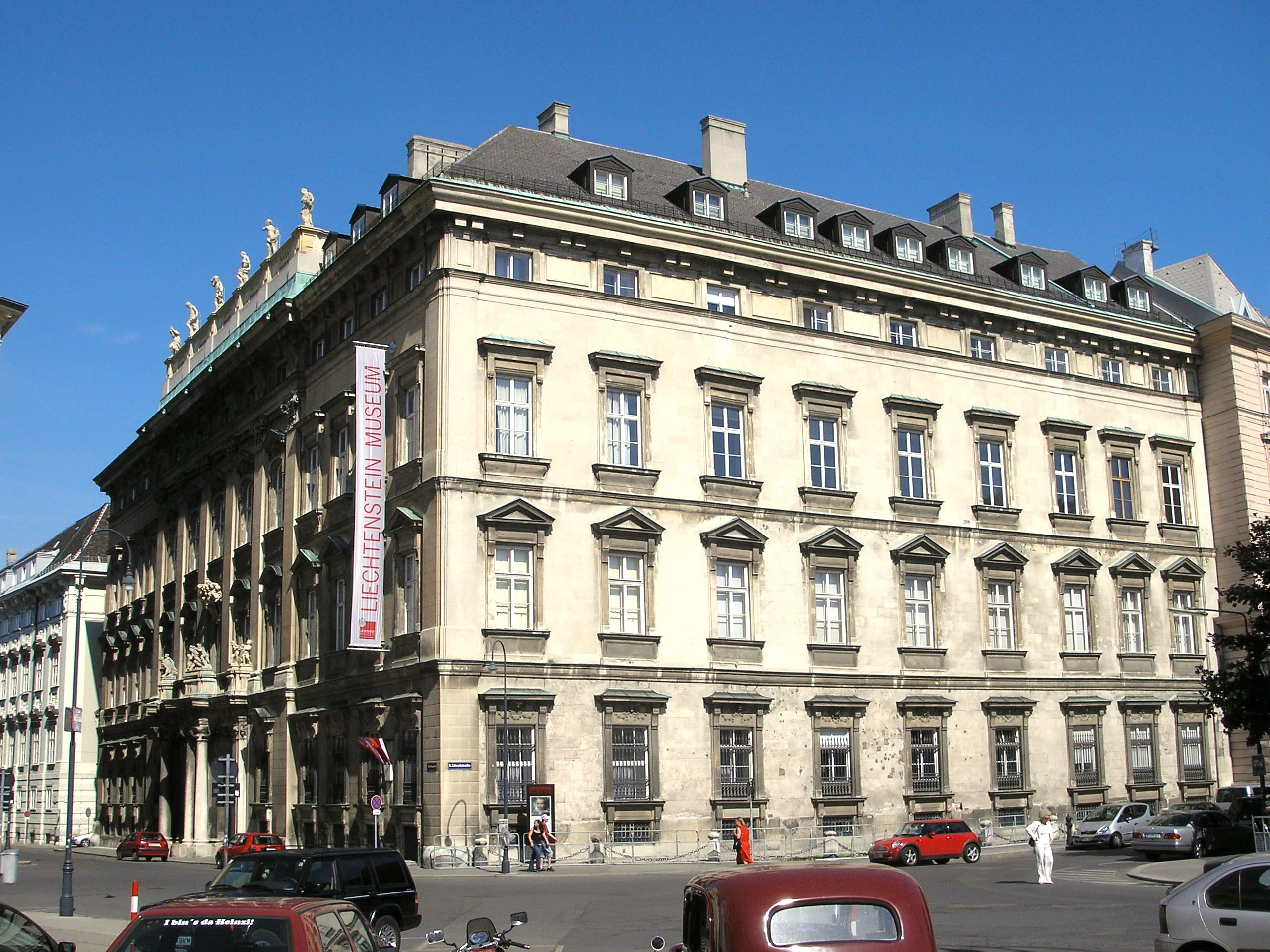
Liechtenstein City Palace in Vienna, private residence and home to the princely 19th century art collection

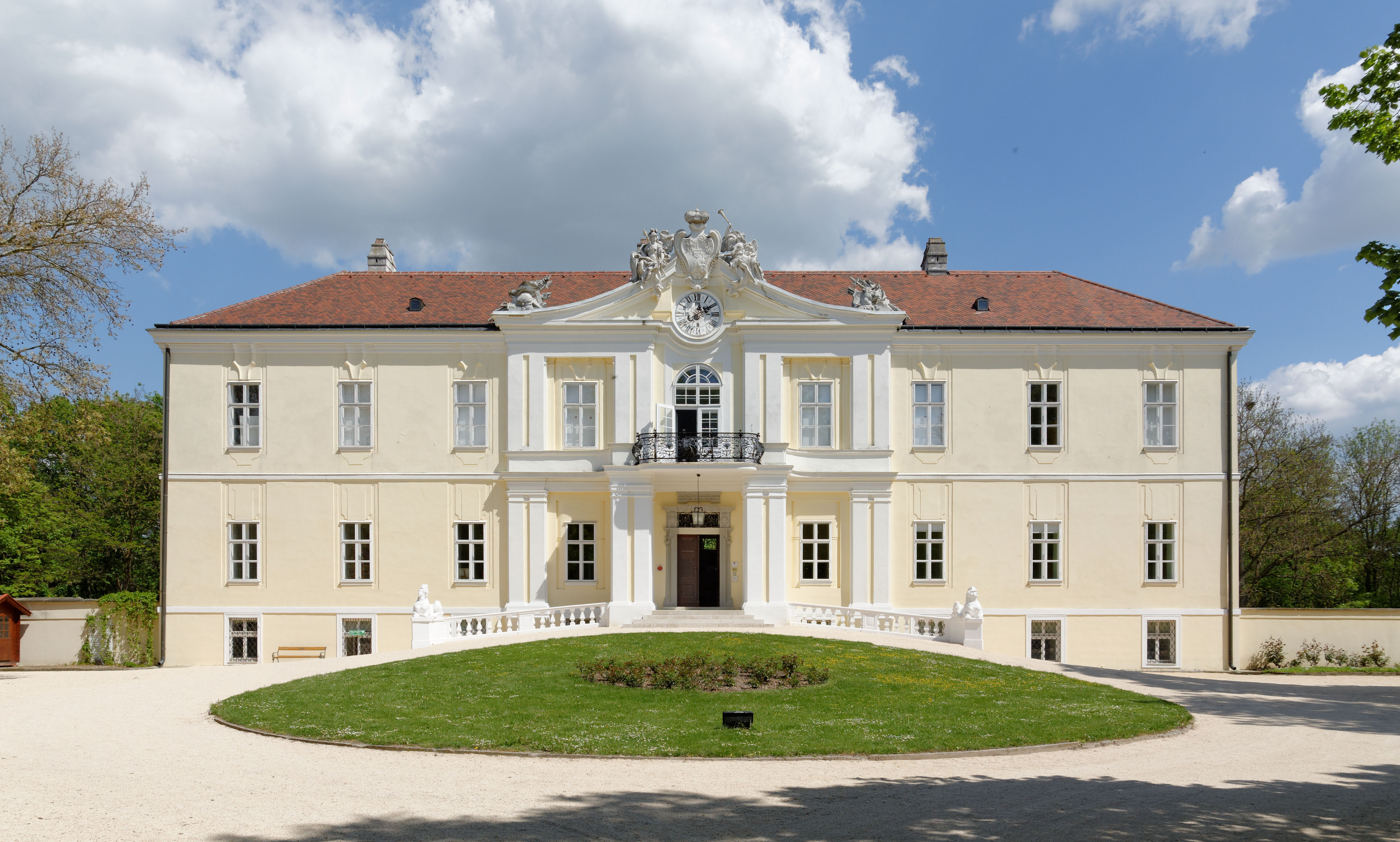
Wilfersdorf Castle, Lower Austria, the prince's Austrian country estate

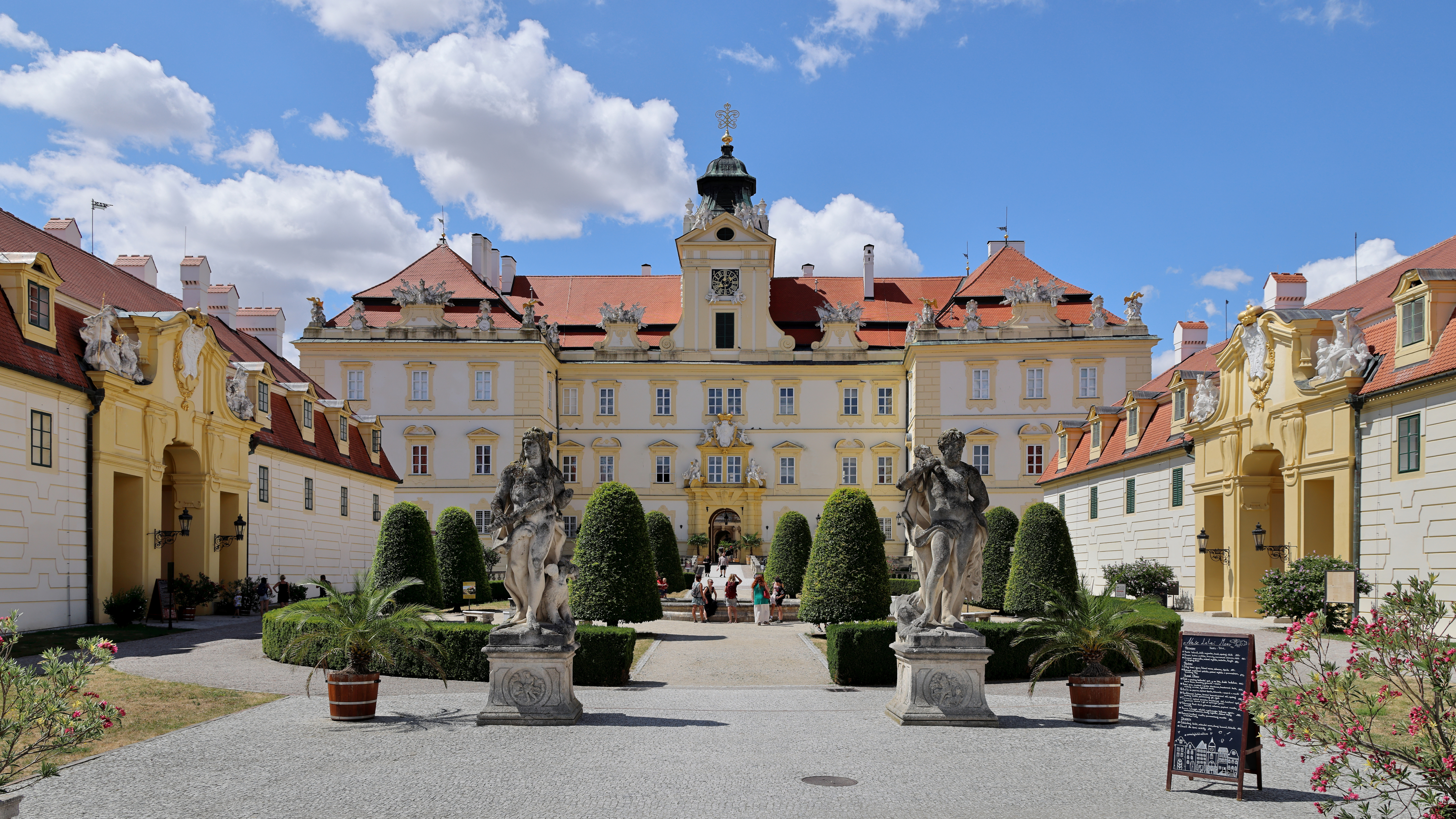
Valtice Castle in the Czech Republic (principal seat of the Liechtenstein princes until World War II, when the Nazi occupiers confiscated it, followed by Czech expropriation after the war)

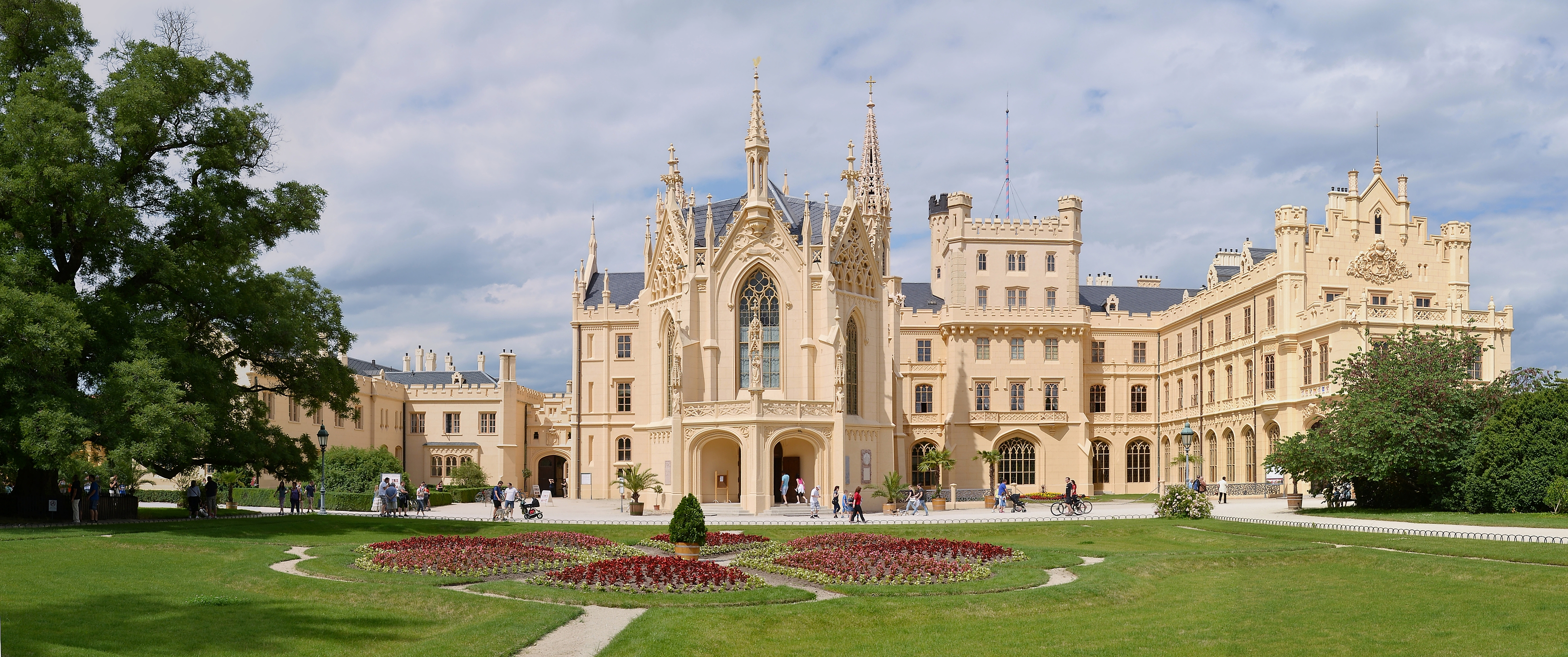
Lednice Castle in the Czech Republic (confiscated, later expropriated)

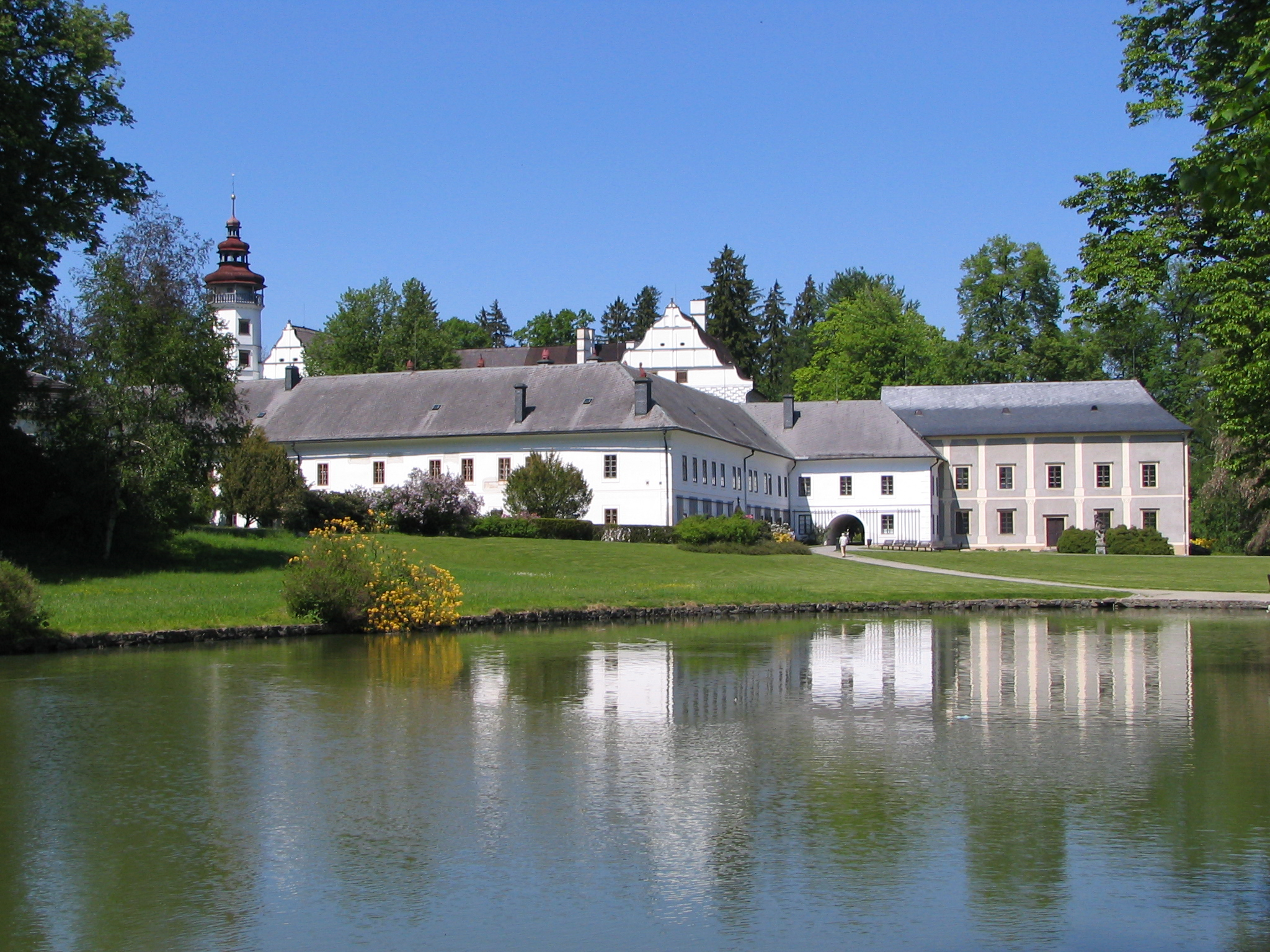
Velké Losiny Castle in the Czech Republic (confiscated, later expropriated)

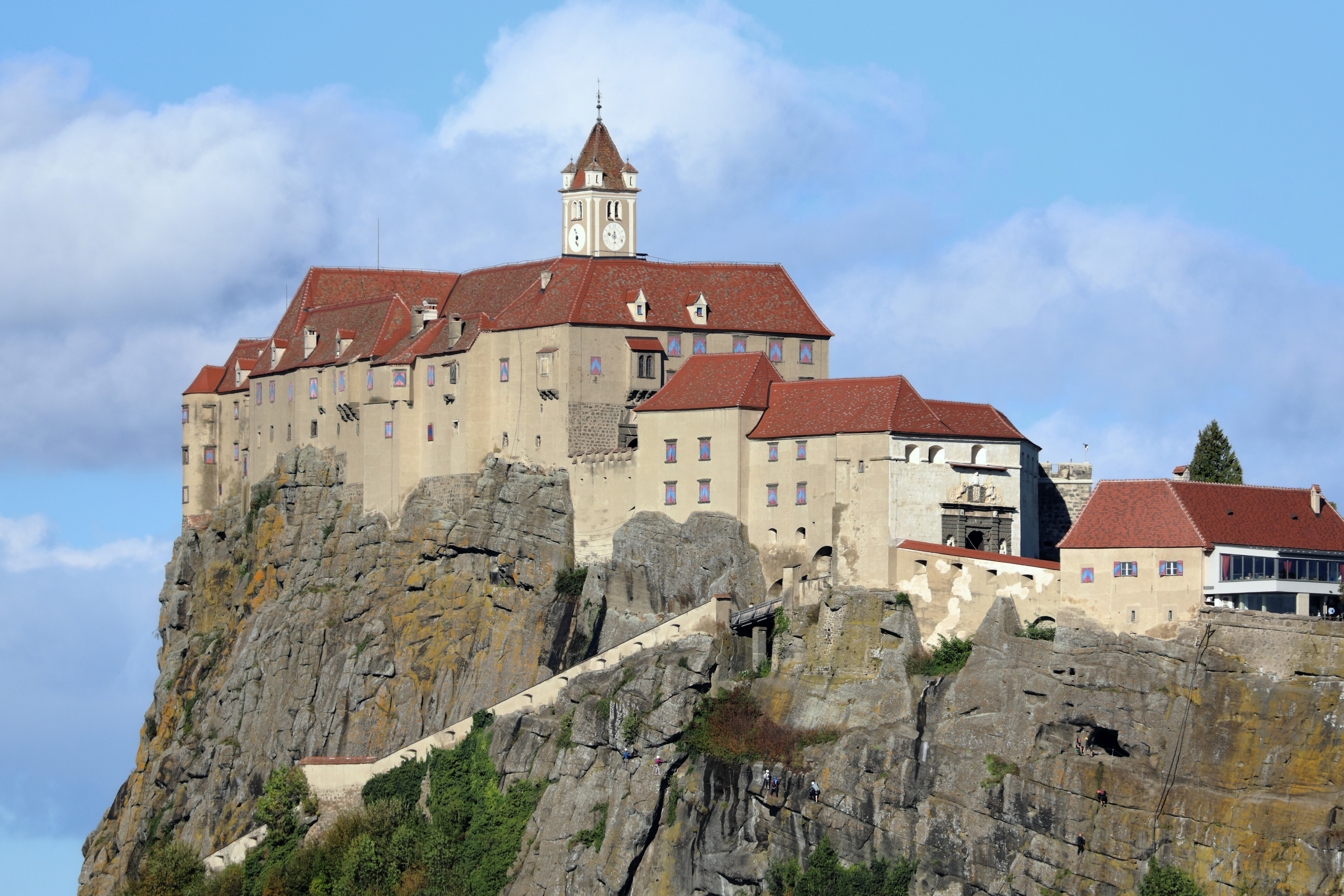
Riegersburg Castle, Austria, seat of a branch line

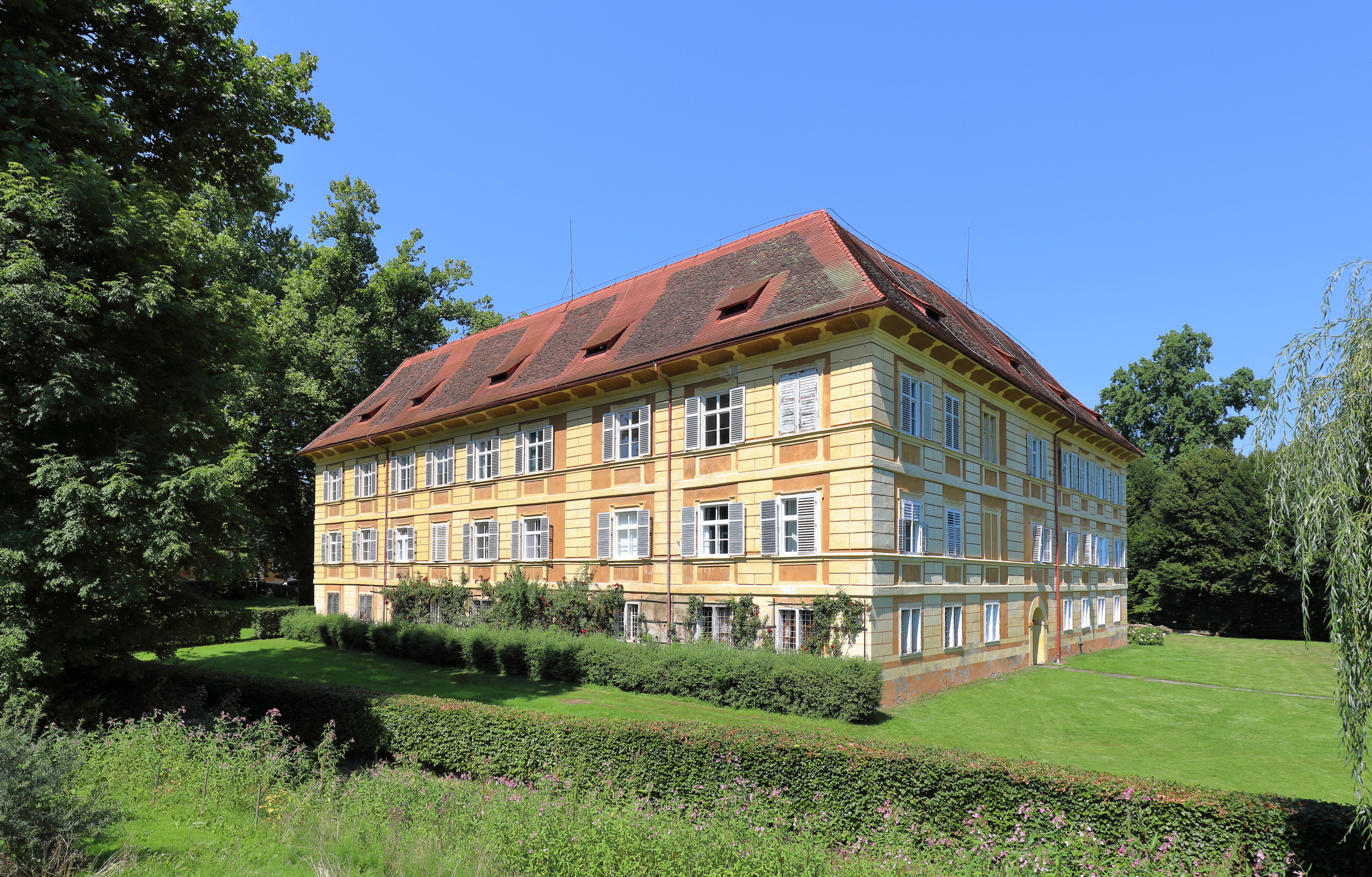
Frauenthal Castle, Austria, seat of a branch line

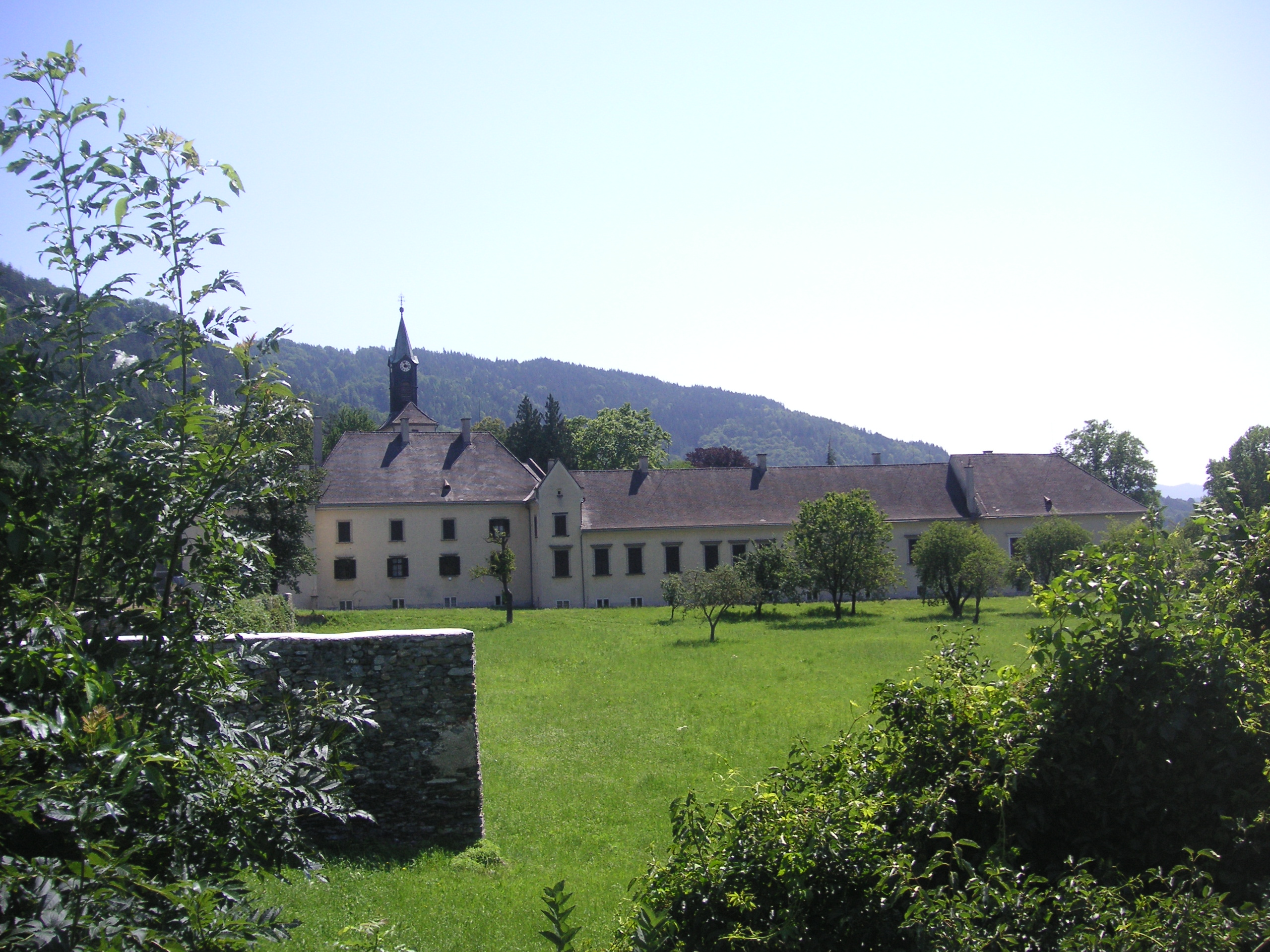
Waldstein Castle, Deutschfeistritz, Austria, seat of a branch line

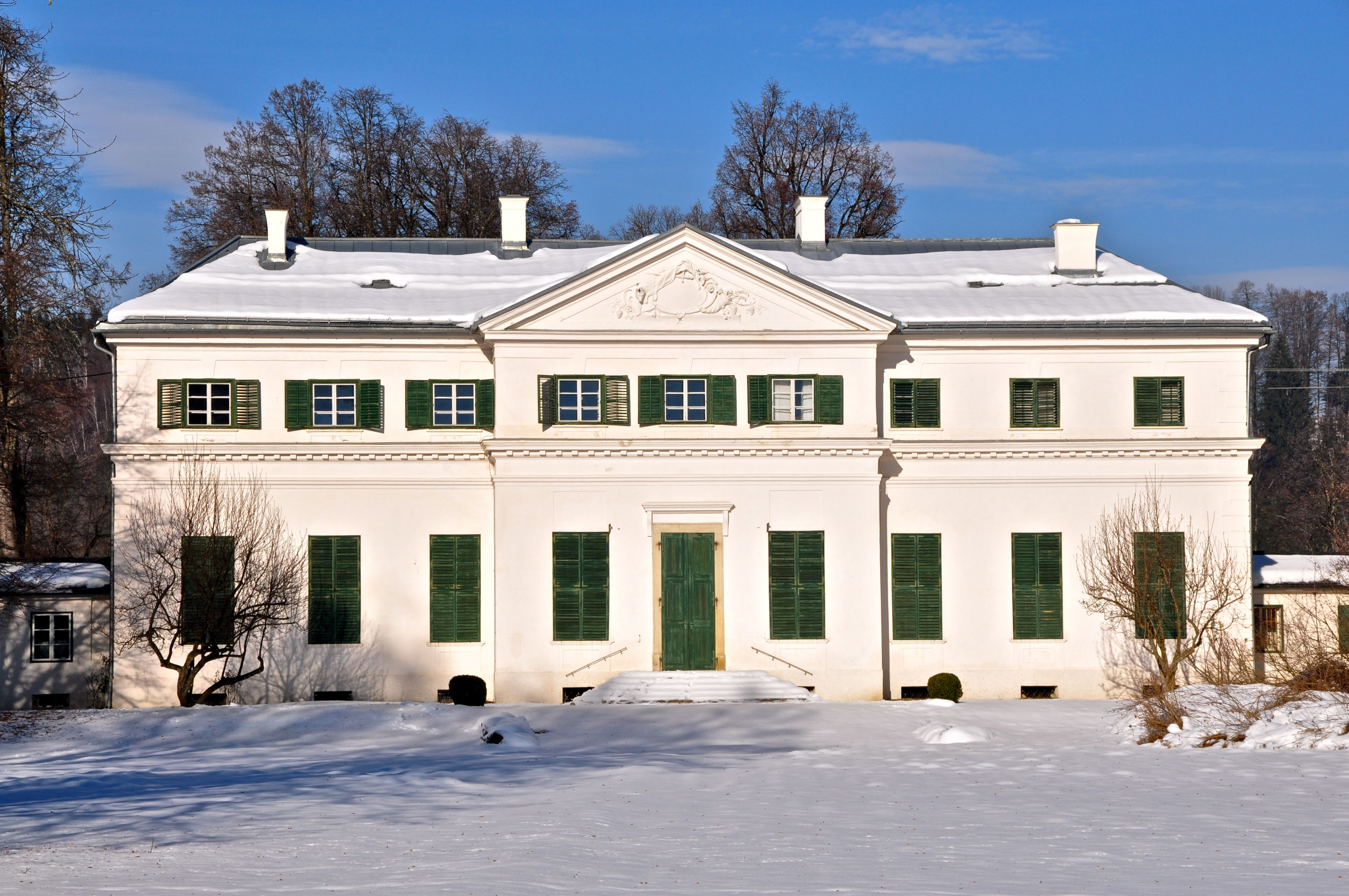
Rosegg House, Austria, seat of a branch line

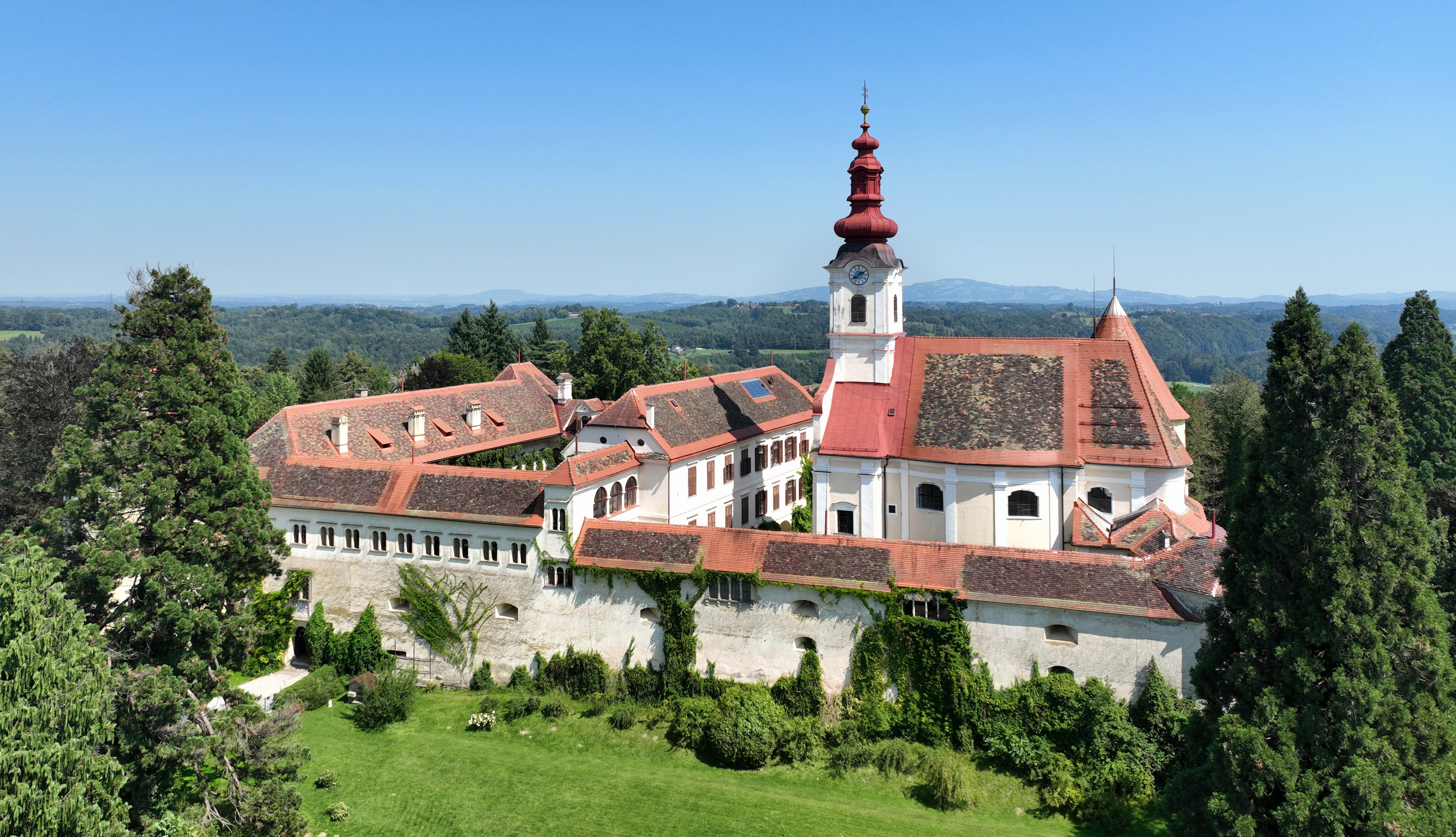
Hollenegg Castle, Austria, seat of a branch line

== See also ==
- Gartenpalais Liechtenstein (for the important princely art collection)
- List of monarchs of Liechtenstein
- List of princesses consort of Liechtenstein
- Order of precedence in Liechtenstein
- Succession to the Liechtensteiner throne
