= Selibice =

- Village
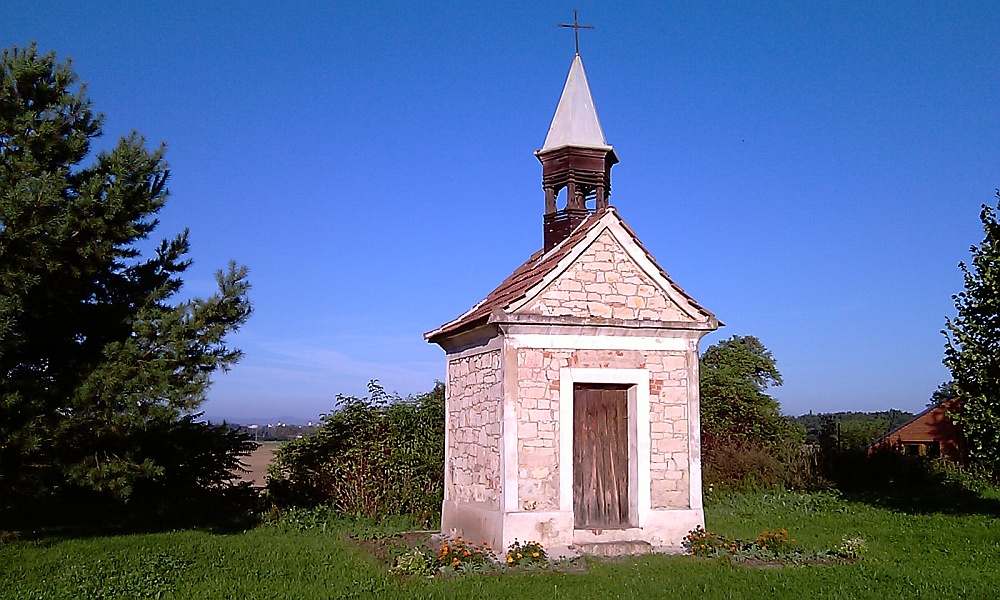
- Chapel in Selibice

- Location in the Czech Republic
- Coordinates: 50°20′34″N 13°36′48″E
- Country: Czech Republic
- Region: Ústí nad Labem
- District: Louny
- Municipality: Staňkovice
- First mentioned: 1352

Area
  - Total: 2.75 km^{2} (1.06 sq mi)
- Elevation: 210 m (690 ft)

Population (2021)
  - Total: 61
  - Density: 22/km^{2} (57/sq mi)
- Time zone: UTC+1 (CET)
  - Summer (DST): UTC+2 (CEST)
- Postal code: 440 01

Selibice (German: Selowitz) is a village and municipal part of Staňkovice in Louny District in the Ústí nad Labem Region of the Czech Republic.

== Etymology ==
The name is derived from the personal name Selib, meaning "the village of Selib's people".

== Geography ==
Selibice is located about 5 kilometres (3 mi) east of Žatec, 46 km (29 mi) southwest of Ústí nad Labem and 61 km (38 mi) northwest of Prague. It lies in an agricultural landscape in the Most Basin. The highest point is at 222 m (728 ft) above sea level.

== History ==
The first written mention of Selibice is from 1352.

After World War II, the German-speaking population was expelled and few new inhabitants from the other end of former Czechoslovakia moved in.

== Demographics ==
Historical population

Year	Pop.	±%
1869	125	—
1880	135	+8.0%
1890	141	+4.4%
1900	184	+30.5%
1910	201	+9.2%

Year	Pop.	±%
1921	195	−3.0%
1930	202	+3.6%
1950	126	−37.6%
1961	128	+1.6%
1970	164	+28.1%

Year	Pop.	±%
1980	90	−45.1%
1991	65	−27.8%
2001	62	−4.6%
2011	71	+14.5%
2021	61	−14.1%

Source: Censuses

== Transport ==
The railway line Most–Žatec runs south of the village, but there is no train station.

== Sights ==
There are no protected cultural monuments in the village area.

A cultural landmark is the local chapel.
