= Wilfersdorf Castle =

Building in Wilfersdorf, Austria

Coordinates: 48°35′7″N 16°38′44″E

- Schloss Wilfersdorf
- Wilfersdorf
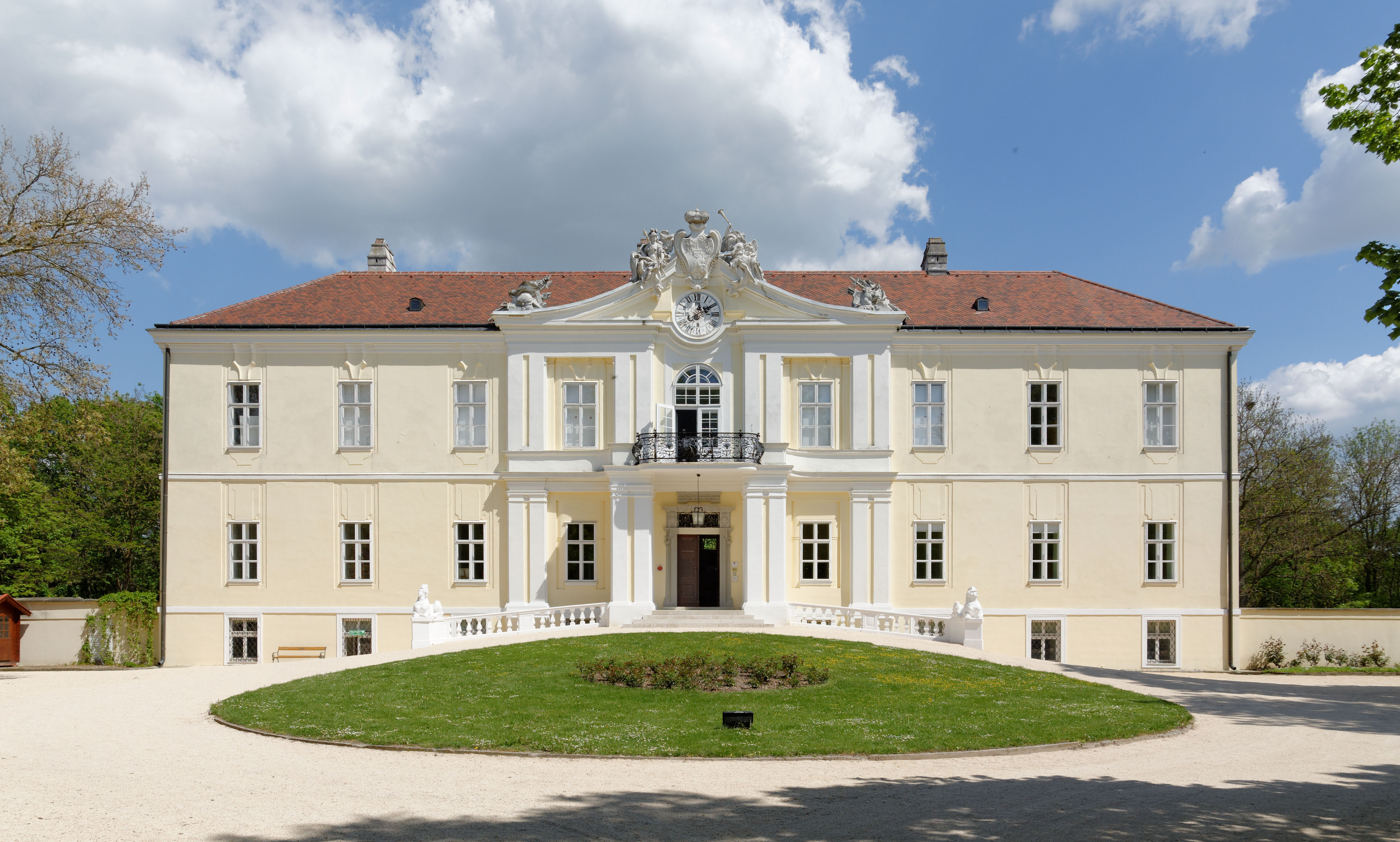
- Wilfersdorf Castle

Site information
- Type: Castle

Site history
- Built: 1600

Wilfersdorf Castle is located in the Weinviertel (wine district) in the town of Wilfersdorf, in the Mistelbach district. The castle and its estate have been continuously owned by the Liechtenstein family since 1436. It always served as a summer and hunting seat of the reigning princes. Today it also houses a cultural and exhibition centre as well as the property management offices of the princely estates in Weinviertel. It is renowned for its princely cellars. A well-known white wine is produced here on 38.5 hectares (95 acres) of vineyards.

== History ==
Around 1600, Gundakar of Liechtenstein had to rebuild a pre-existing Gothic castle as a four-winged water chateau. Around 1802, Prince Alois I of Liechtenstein had the northern, southern and eastern wings removed. The remainder of the castle was ravaged by the French in 1809 and in 1866 the Prussians established a field hospital there. At the end of the Second World War, the castle suffered significant damage. Repairs were conducted over a period of many years. Between 2001 and 2002, existing buildings were restored.

== Today ==
The main building is now a cultural and exhibition centre. A multipurpose social hall on the ground floor provides space for seminars, presentations and small conferences. A large collection of documentation on the history of the Liechtenstein family is also displayed on this floor. The Wilfersdorf National History Museum is located in the adjoining building.

== See also ==
- Lednice–Valtice Cultural Landscape
- Liechtenstein Castle (Maria Enzersdorf)
- Schloss Liechtenstein (Maria Enzersdorf)
- Stadtpalais Liechtenstein and Liechtenstein Garden Palace in Vienna, Austria
- Vaduz Castle in Liechtenstein – the official residence of the Princely Family of Liechtenstein
