= Bonitz =

Bonitz is a German language habitational surname denoting a person from Ponitz (place name of Slavic origin from the Old Sorbian components po "on, through, along" and něť "fireplace, oven, stove"; therefore a Slavic term for a settlement created by "slash and burn") and may refer to:

- Henry E. Bonitz (1872–1921), American architect
- Hermann Bonitz (1814–1888), German scholar
- Justin Bonitz (born 1990), American singer, songwriter, musician
