= Staňkovice (Louny District) =

- Municipality
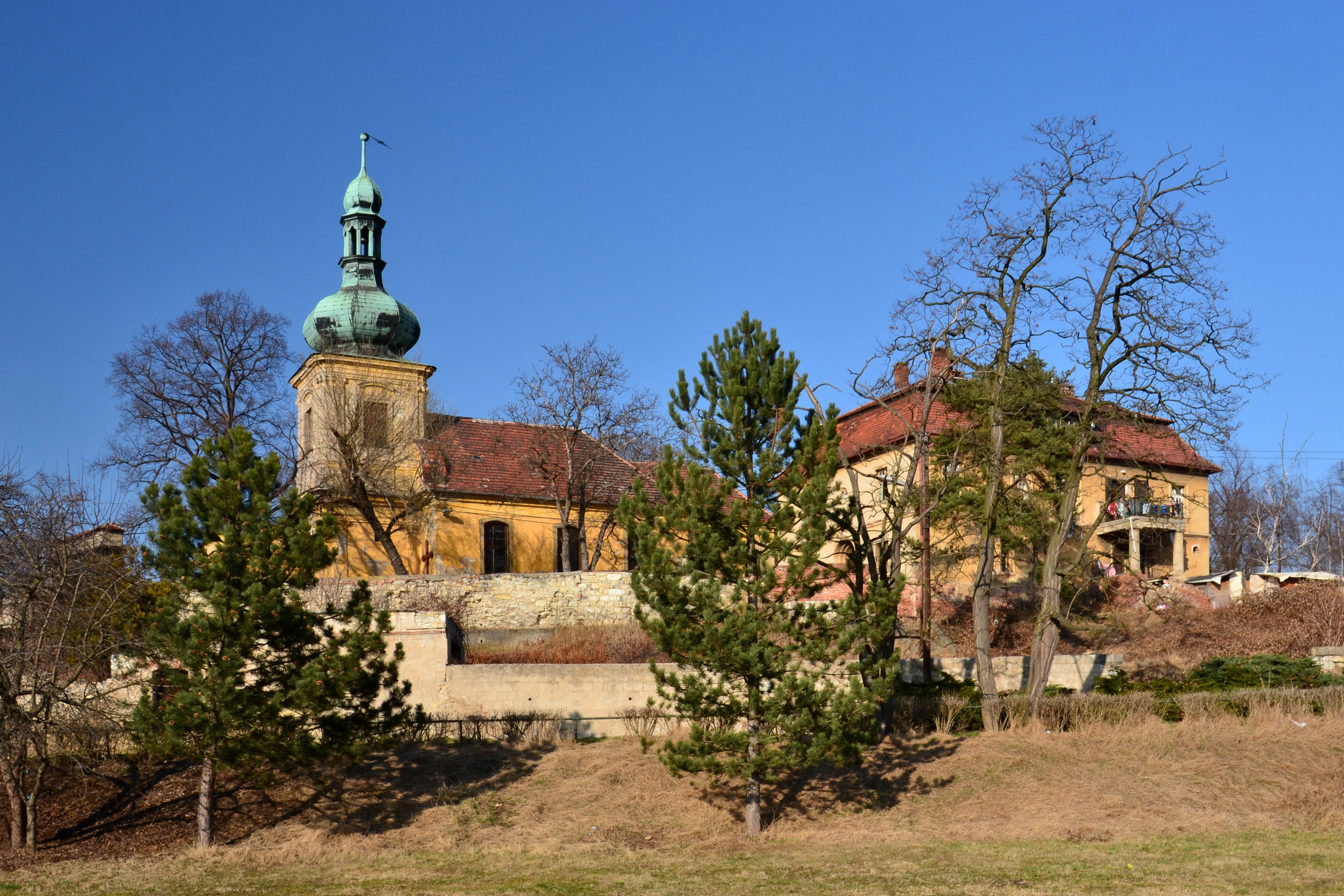
- Church of Saint Wenceslaus

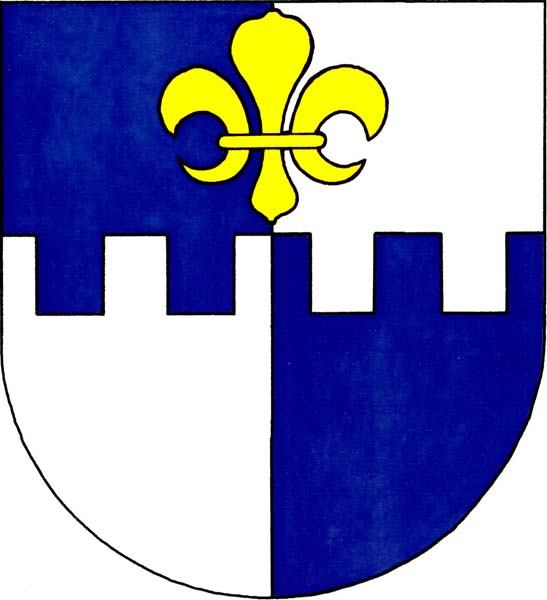
- Flag Coat of arms

- Location in the Czech Republic
- Coordinates: 50°21′0″N 13°34′16″E
- Country: Czech Republic
- Region: Ústí nad Labem
- District: Louny
- First mentioned: 1225

Area
  - Total: 14.23 km^{2} (5.49 sq mi)
- Elevation: 206 m (676 ft)

Population (2026-01-01)
  - Total: 1,148
  - Density: 80.67/km^{2} (208.9/sq mi)
- Time zone: UTC+1 (CET)
  - Summer (DST): UTC+2 (CEST)
- Postal codes: 438 01, 439 49, 440 01
- Website: www.stankovice.cz

Staňkovice (German: Stankowitz) is a municipality and village in Louny District in the Ústí nad Labem Region of the Czech Republic. It has about 1,100 inhabitants.

== Administrative division ==
Staňkovice consists of four municipal parts (in brackets population according to the 2021 census):

- Staňkovice (796)
- Staňkovice Průmyslová zóna Triangle (0)
- Selibice (61)
- Tvršice (163)

== Etymology ==
The name Staňkovice is derived from the personal name Staněk, meaning "the village of Staněk's people".

== Geography ==
Staňkovice is located about 3 kilometres (2 mi) northeast of Žatec, 48 km (30 mi) southwest of Ústí nad Labem and 64 km (40 mi) northwest of Prague. It lies in an agricultural landscape in the Most Basin. The highest point is at 281 m (922 ft) above sea level. The Ohře River flows through the southern part of the municipality, next to the Tvršice village.

== History ==
The first written mention of Staňkovice is from 1225, when the village was bought by Abbot Adamus Bertold. From the 13th century, the village was owned by the Strahov Monastery, but the monastery often rented it to various burghers of Žatec. During the Hussite Wars (1419–1434), Staňkovice was acquired by the town of Žatec. In 1547–1594, it belonged to the Líčkov estate, but then it returned to the town of Žatec. As a result of the Bohemian Revolt, properties of Žatec were confiscated and Staňkovice became again part of the Líčkov estate, owned by Estera Juliána Hrzánová of Harasov and her husband Jaroslav of Hazmburk.

== Demographics ==
Historical population

Year	Pop.	±%
1869	930	—
1880	1,090	+17.2%
1890	1,261	+15.7%
1900	1,461	+15.9%
1910	1,452	−0.6%

Year	Pop.	±%
1921	1,410	−2.9%
1930	1,502	+6.5%
1950	909	−39.5%
1961	1,316	+44.8%
1970	1,191	−9.5%

Year	Pop.	±%
1980	956	−19.7%
1991	747	−21.9%
2001	840	+12.4%
2011	853	+1.5%
2021	1,020	+19.6%

Source: Censuses

== Economy ==
Part of the Triangle Industrial Zone lies within the municipality.

== Transport ==
The D7 motorway from Prague to Chomutov runs north of Staňkovice, just outside the municipality.

The village of Tvršice is located on the railway line Most–Žatec.

== Sights ==
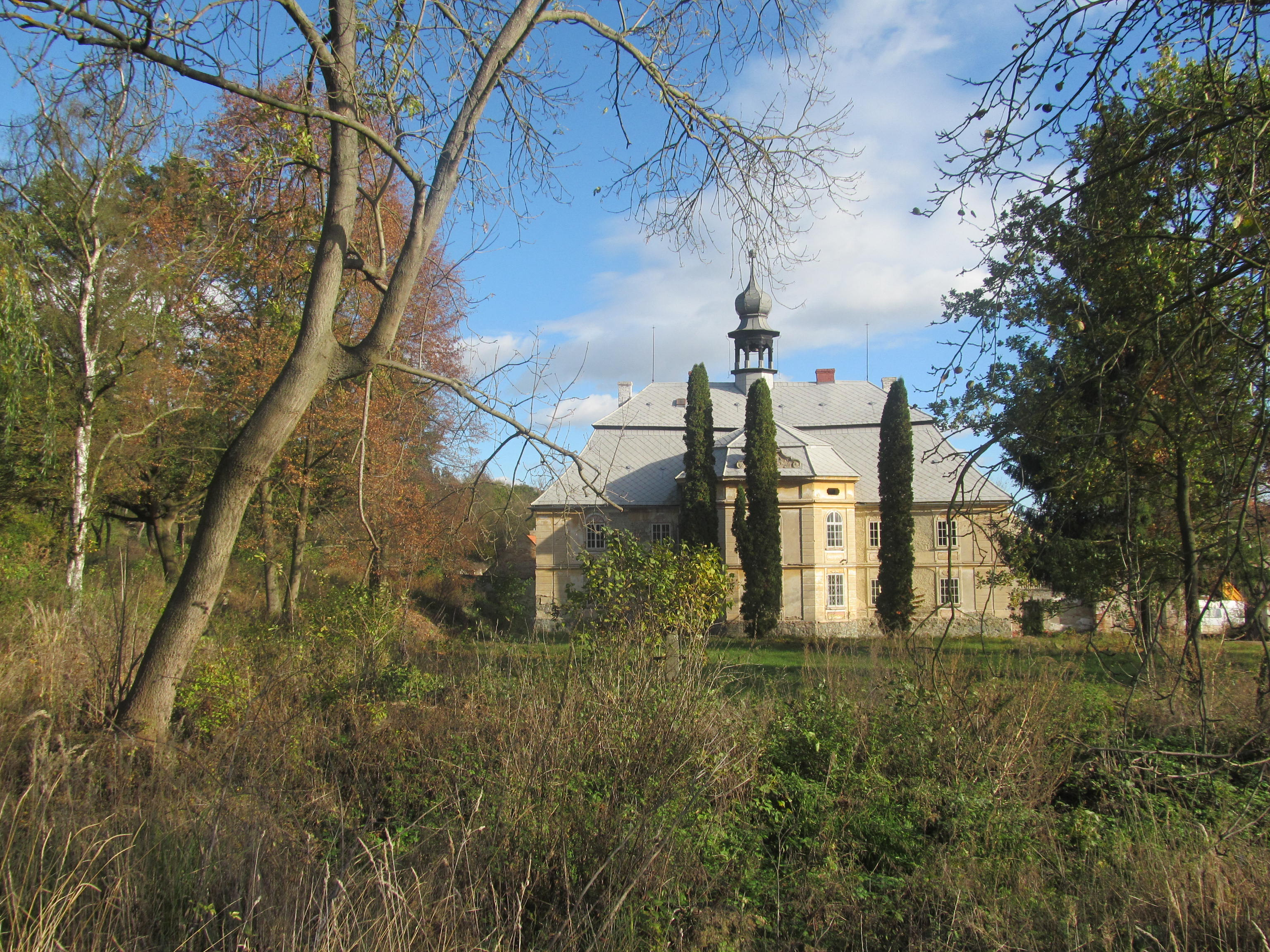
Staňkovice Castle

The main landmark of Staňkovice is the Church of Saint Wenceslaus. Originally a late Gothic church from the 15th century, it was rebuilt in the Baroque style in the 18th century.

A notable building is the Staňkovice Castle, located east of Staňkovice outside the built-up area. It is a late Baroque manor house, built at the turn of the 18th and 19th centuries. It is a complex of several residential and farm buildings and today is privately owned.
