= Wilfersdorf =

- Municipality
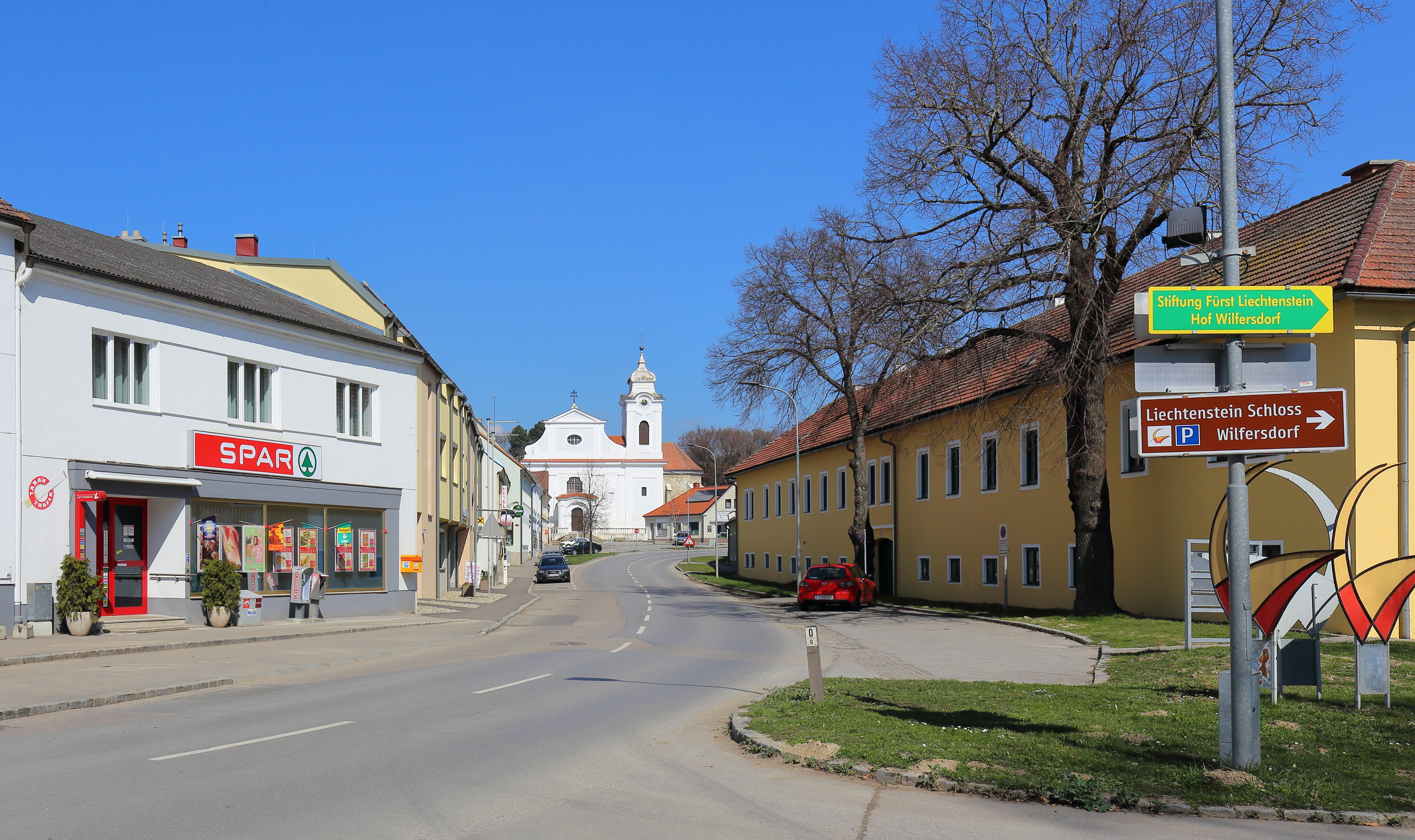

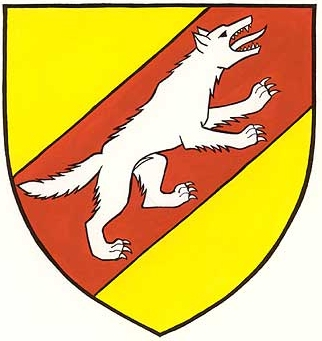
- Coat of arms

- Location within Austria
- Coordinates: 48°35′N 16°39′E
- Country: Austria
- State: Lower Austria
- District: Mistelbach

Government
  - Mayor: Josef Tatzber

Area
  - Total: 30.47 km^{2} (11.76 sq mi)
- Elevation: 190 m (620 ft)

Population (2018-01-01)
  - Total: 2,175
  - Density: 71.38/km^{2} (184.9/sq mi)
- Time zone: UTC+1 (CET)
  - Summer (DST): UTC+2 (CEST)
- Postal code: 2193
- Area code: 02573
- Website: www.wilfersdorf.at

Wilfersdorf is a town in the district of Mistelbach in the Austrian state of Lower Austria.

Wifersdorf Castle is located in the town.

The first recorded reference was in 1514.

== Population ==
Historical population
Year	Pop.	±%
1869	2,103	—
1900	2,263	+7.6%
1939	2,068	−8.6%
1951	2,138	+3.4%
1961	2,048	−4.2%
1971	2,086	+1.9%
1981	1,906	−8.6%
1991	1,829	−4.0%
2001	2,037	+11.4%
2011	2,124	+4.3%
