= Kyjovice (Opava District) =

- Municipality
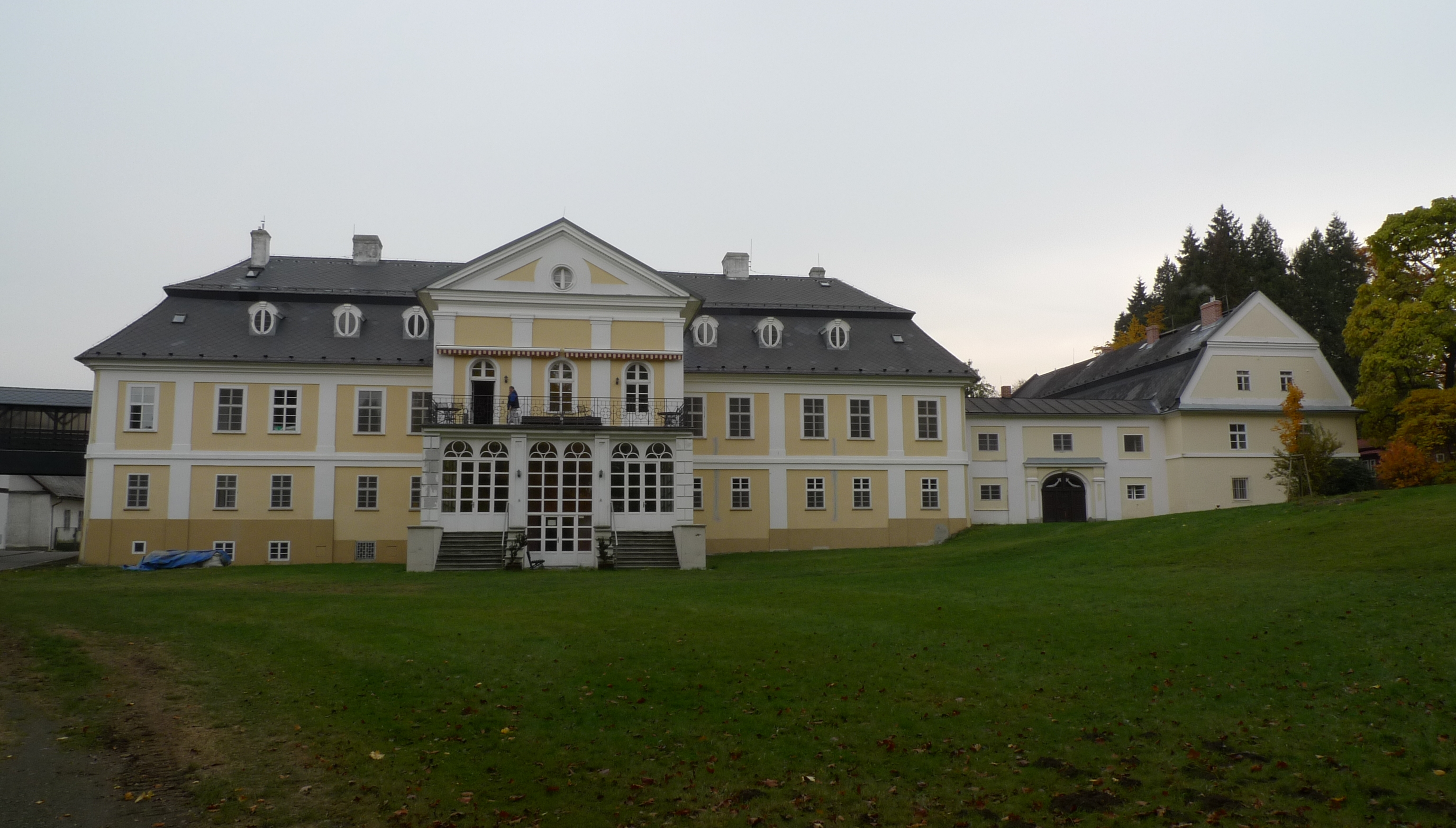
- Kyjovice Castle

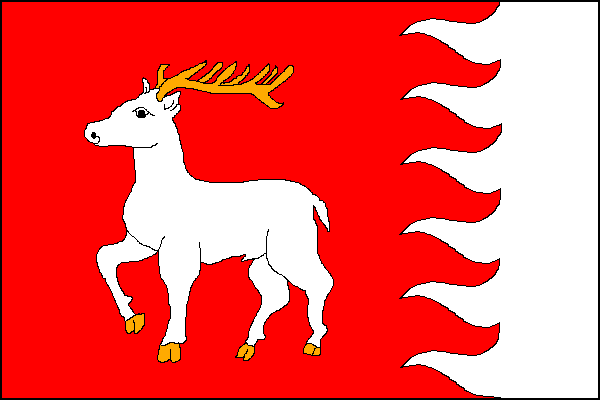
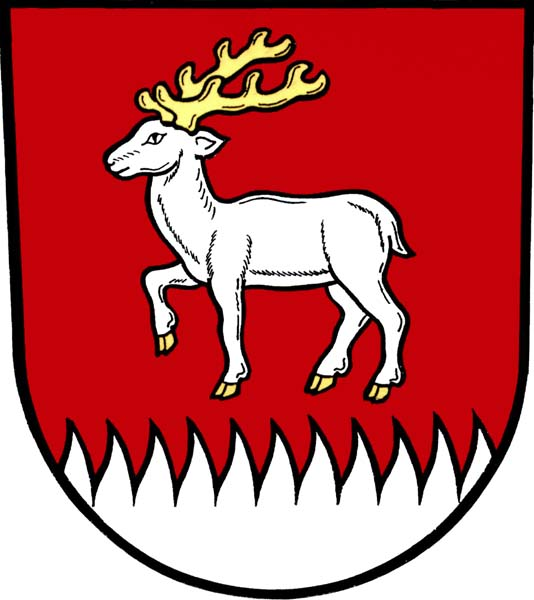
- Flag Coat of arms

- Location in the Czech Republic
- Coordinates: 49°49′56″N 18°2′32″E
- Country: Czech Republic
- Region: Moravian-Silesian
- District: Opava
- First mentioned: 1430

Area
  - Total: 6.92 km^{2} (2.67 sq mi)
- Elevation: 378 m (1,240 ft)

Population (2026-01-01)
  - Total: 870
  - Density: 130/km^{2} (330/sq mi)
- Time zone: UTC+1 (CET)
  - Summer (DST): UTC+2 (CEST)
- Postal code: 747 68
- Website: www.kyjovice.cz

Kyjovice is a municipality and village in Opava District in the Moravian-Silesian Region of the Czech Republic. It has about 900 inhabitants.

== History ==
The first written mention of Kyjovice is from 1430. The village was founded around 1290.

== Demographics ==
Historical population
Year	Pop.	±%
1869	589	—
1880	678	+15.1%
1890	603	−11.1%
1900	668	+10.8%
1910	736	+10.2%
1921	714	−3.0%
1930	763	+6.9%
1950	686	−10.1%
1961	782	+14.0%
1970	876	+12.0%
1980	870	−0.7%
1991	826	−5.1%
2001	834	+1.0%
2011	815	−2.3%
2021	881	+8.1%
Source: Censuses
