= Prince Karl Johann of Liechtenstein =

Prince of Liechtenstein

Prince Johann Karl
- Born: 14 June 1803; Vienna
- Died: 12 October 1871 (aged 68); Ischl
- Spouse: Rosalie d'Hemricourt, Countess of Grünne (m. 1832; died 1841)
- Issue: Prince Rudolf; Prince Philipp Karl Alexander; Princess Albertine Josepha
Names
- Johann Borromäus Karl Nepomuk Anton
- House: Liechtenstein
- Father: Johann I Joseph
- Mother: Landgravine Josefa of Fürstenberg-Weitra

Prince Karl Johann of Liechtenstein (Karl Borromäus Johann Nepomuk Anton; 14 June 1803, in Vienna – 12 October 1871, in Ischl) was the third and youngest son of Johann I Joseph, Prince of Liechtenstein (1760–1836) and wife Landgravine Josefa of Fürstenberg-Weitra (1776–1848), nephew of Aloys I, brother of Aloys II and uncle of Johann II and Franz I.

His father, Prince Johann I, ceded governance of Lichtenstein to him when he was still a minor in 1806, according to the terms of a treaty with the Confederation of the Rhine, which dissolved in 1813.

== Marriage and issue ==
On 10 September 1832, in Graz, he married Rosalie d'Hemricourt Gräfin von Grünne (3 March 1805, in Vienna – 20 April 1841, in Freiwaldau), elder sister of Count Karl Ludwig von Grünne, daughter of Count Philipp Ferdinand von Grünne-Pinchart (1762-1854) and his wife, Baroness Rosalie van der Feltz (1779-1811). She was widow of Ludwig Johann Heinrich, Graf von Schönfeldt (20 March 1791, in Vienna – 19 August 1828, in Reitenau), and had three children:

- Prince Rudolf (28 December 1833, in Graz – 23 May 1888, in Burg Pienzenau, Weyarn), married firstly in Vienna on 28 May 1859 and divorced in 1877 Klara Gräfin Sermage de Szomszédvár (19 September 1836, in Vienna – 8 April 1909, in Munich), and had issue, an only daughter, and married secondly in Klausenburg (Cluj-Napoca), on 8 October 1877 Marie Therese Hedwig Perzel (Stein?) (c. 1846 in Liegnitz – 17 May 1921, in Wiesbaden), without issue:
  - Princess Klara Maria Carolina Rudolfina (27 January 1861, in Vienna – 8 November 1861, in Vienna)
- Prince Philipp Karl Alexander (17 July 1837, in Graz – 15 March 1901, in Vienna), married firstly on 12 May 1862 Countess Marianne Marcolini-Ferretti (c. 1845 – 7 June 1864, in Klenovnik, near Varaždin, Croatia), and had issue, two sons, and married secondly in Budapest on 25 March 1879 Franziska Chalupatzky, by adoption Todesco (21 August 1843, in Vienna – 1 October 1921, in Bad Ischl), daughter of Henrietta Strauss without issue:
  - Prince Karl Joseph Camillo Philipp Maria (27 September 1862, in Klenovnik – 24 February 1893, in Neulengbach), unmarried and without issue
  - Prince Joseph Philipp (22 August 1863, in Klenovnik – 22 August 1863, in Klenovnik)
- Princess Albertine Josepha Antonia (29 June 1838, in Graz – 25 April 1844, in Vienna)

== Ancestry ==
Ancestors of Prince Karl Johann of Liechtenstein

16. Prince Philipp Erasmus of Liechtenstein
8. Prince Emanuel of Liechtenstein
17. Princess Christina of Löwenstein-Wertheim-Rochefort
4. Franz Joseph I, Prince of Liechtenstein
18. Count Karl Ludwig of Dietrichstein
9. Countess Antonia of Dietrichstein-Weichselstädt
19. Countess Maria Theresa Anna of Trauttmansdorff
2. Johann I Joseph, Prince of Liechtenstein
20. Count Franz Damian of Sternberg
10. Count Franz Philipp of Sternberg
21. Countess Maria Josepha of Trauttmansdorff
5. Countess Leopoldine of Sternberg
22. Count Conrad Sigismund of Starhemberg
11. Countess Leopoldine of Starhemberg
23. Princess Maria Leopoldine of Löwenstein-Wertheim-Rochefort
1. Prince Karl Johann of Liechtenstein
24. Prosper Ferdinand, Landgrave of Fürstenberg-Stühlingen
12. Ludwig August Egon, Landgrave of Fürstenberg-Weitra
25. Countess Sophie of Königsegg-Rothenfels
6. Joachim Egon, Landgrave of Fürstenberg-Weitra
26. Count Maximilian of Kirchberg
13. Countess Maria Anna of Kirchberg
27. Countess Maria Judith of Törring
3. Landgravine Josepha of Fürstenberg-Weitra
28. Count Anton Karl of Oettingen-Wallerstein
14. Count Philipp Karl of Oettingen-Wallerstein
29. Countess Maria Agnes Fugger of Glött
7. Countess Sophia Maria of Oettingen-Wallerstein
30. Kraft Anton, Count of Oettingen-Baldern and Katzenstein
15. Countess Charlotte Juliane of Oettingen-Baldern
31. Countess Maria Eleonora of Schönborn-Buchheim
