= Josefa of Fürstenberg-Weitra =

Princess of Liechtenstein from 1805 to 1836

Josepha of Fürstenberg-Weitra
- Duchess of Troppau and Jägerndorf
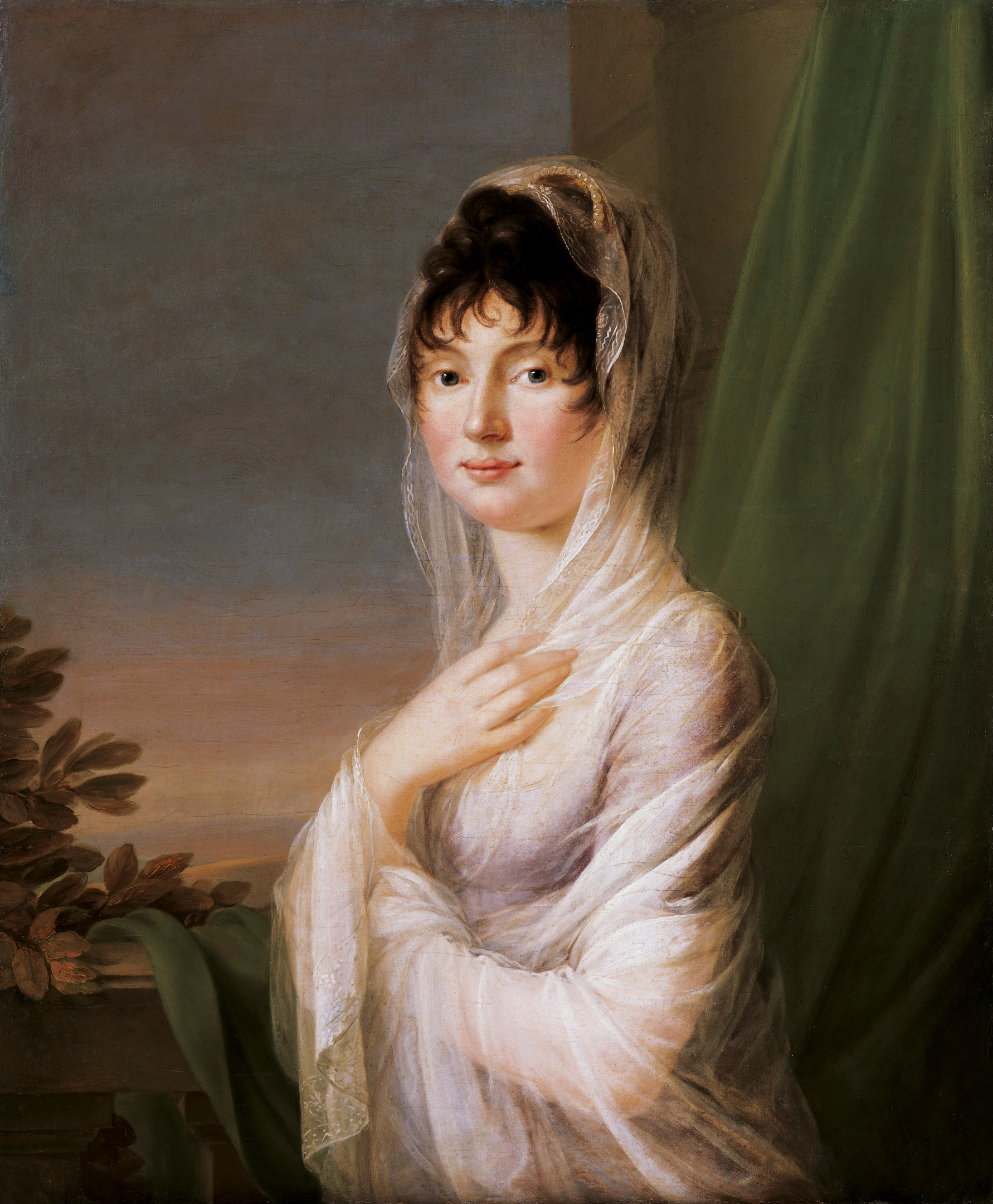

Princess consort of Liechtenstein
- Tenure: 24 March 1805 – 20 April 1836
- Born: 21 June 1776; Vienna, Austria
- Died: 23 February 1848 (aged 71); Vienna
- Burial: Church of the Nativity of the Virgin Mary, Brno
- Spouse: Johann I Joseph, Prince of Liechtenstein (m. 1792; died 1848)
- Issue: Princess Maria Leopoldine; Princess Karoline; Aloys II, Prince of Liechtenstein; Princess Maria, Countess Esterházy von Galántha; Prince Franz de Paula of Liechtenstein; Prince Karl Johann; Princess Klothilda; Princess Henriette, Countess Hunyady von Kethély; Prince Friedrich Adalbert; Prince Eduard Franz; Prince August; Ida, Princess Paar; Prince Rudolf
Names
- Maria Josepha Sophie
- House: House of Fürstenberg-Weitra
- Father: Joachim Egon, Landgrave of Fürstenberg-Weitra
- Mother: Countess Sophia Maria of Oettingen-Wallerstein

Landgravine Josepha of Fürstenberg-Weitra (German: Landgräfin Josefa zu Fürstenberg-Weitra; 21 June 1776 – 23 February 1848) was princess consort of Liechtenstein as the wife of Johann I Joseph, Prince of Liechtenstein. By virtue of her birth, she was member of the House of Fürstenberg. Around 1801, Beethoven made a dedication to Josepha, his Sonata No. 13 in E-flat Major, op.27, no. 1.

== Early life ==
Josepha was born at Vienna, Austria, the first daughter of Joachim Egon, Landgrave of Fürstenberg-Weitra and his wife, Countess Sophia Maria of Oettingen-Wallerstein.

== Personal life ==
On 12 April 1792 in Vienna, she married Prince Johann Joseph of Liechtenstein, the fourth son of Franz Joseph I and Countess Leopoldine von Sternberg. After his elder brother Aloys's death in 1805, Prince Johann Joseph became heir apparent to the Principality of Liechtenstein. Together, they had fourteen children:

- Princess Maria Leopoldine Josepha Sophia Aemiliana (1793–1808), who died young.
- Princess Karoline (1795–1795), who died in infancy.
- Aloys II, Prince of Liechtenstein (1796–1858), who married Countess Franziska Kinsky of Wchinitz and Tettau in 1831.
- Princess Maria Sophie Josepha (1798–1869), who married Count Vincenz Esterházy von Galántha in Vienna in 1817.
- Princess Maria Josepha (1800–1884), who died unmarried and without issue.
- Prince Franz de Paula of Liechtenstein (1802–1887), who married Countess Julia Potocka and had issue; his great-grandson would eventually become Prince Franz Joseph II.
- Prince Karl Johann of Liechtenstein (1803–1871), who married Countess Rosalie d'Hemricourt von Grünne and had issue.
- Princess Klothilda Leopoldina Josepha (1804–1807), who died young.
- Princess Henriette (1806–1886), who married Count Joseph Hunyady von Kethély in Vienna in 1825 and had 6 children; Janos (1826-1861), Imre Joachim (1827-1902), Franziska (1832-1910), Sophie (1835-1869), Karolina (1836-1907), Maria ((1838-1908).
- Prince Friedrich Adalbert (1807–1885), 1,018th Knight of the Order of the Golden Fleece in Austria; he married Johanna Sophie Christiane Löwe in 1848 at Schloss Rosegg.
- Prince Eduard Franz of Liechtenstein (1809–1864), who married Countess Honoria Choloniowa-Choloniewska.
- Prince August Ludwig Ignaz (1810–1824), who died unmarried.
- Princess Ida Leopoldine Sophie Marie Josephine Franziska (1811–1884), a Dame of the Imperial Court, Dame of the Order of the Starry Cross; she married Karl, 4th Prince Paar von Hartberg und Krottenstein in Vienna in 1832.
- Prince Rudolf Maria Franz Placidus (1816–1848), who unmarried and without issue.

Princess Josepha died in Vienna on 23 February 1848.

Josefa of Fürstenberg-Weitra House of Fürstenberg-Weitra Cadet branch of the House of Fürstenberg Born: 21 June 1776 Died: 23 February 1848
Liechtensteiner royalty
Preceded by Caroline von Manderscheid-Blankenheim	Princess consort of Liechtenstein; 1805–1836	Succeeded by Franziska Kinsky von Wchinitz und Tettau
