= Prince Franz de Paula of Liechtenstein =

Liechtensteiner prince (1802–1887)

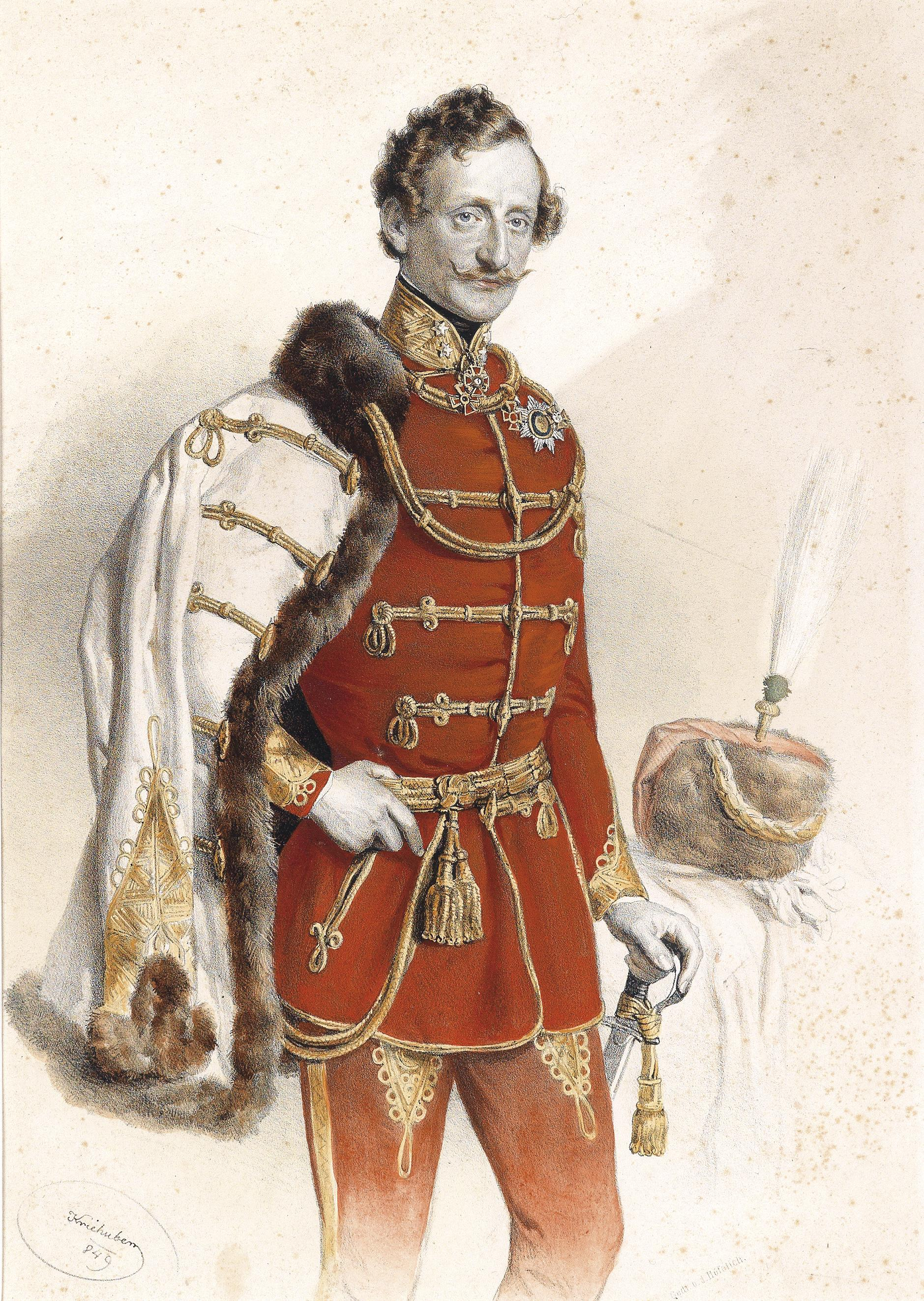
- Lithographie by Josef Kriehuber, 1849
- Born: 25 February 1802; Vienna, Archduchy of Austria, Holy Roman Empire
- Died: 31 March 1887 (aged 85); Vienna, Austria-Hungary
- Burial: Church of the Nativity of the Virgin Mary, Brno
- Spouse: Ewa Jozefina Julia Eudoksia Hrabina Potocka (m. 1841)
- Issue: Prince Alfred of Liechtenstein; Princess Josefina Marie Juliane; Prince Aloys Franz de Paula Maria; Prince Heinrich Karl August
Names
- Franz de Paula Joachim Joseph
- House: Liechtenstein
- Father: Johann I Joseph, Prince of Liechtenstein
- Mother: Landgravine Josefa of Fürstenberg-Weitra

Prince Franz de Paula Joachim Joseph of Liechtenstein (25 February 1802 – 31 March 1887) was the son of Johann I Joseph, Prince of Liechtenstein, and his princess consort, Landgravine Josefa of Fürstenberg-Weitra. He was the nephew of Prince Aloys I, brother of Prince Aloys II, and uncle of Princes Johann II and Franz I.

== Marriage and issue ==
On 3 June 1841, in Vienna, he married Ewa Jozefina Julia Eudoxia Hrabia Potocka (Paris, 10 August 1818 – Vienna, 21 May 1895), sister of Count Alfred Józef Potocki (1817–1889), Sejm Marshal, Minister-President of Austria, and had four children:

- Prince Alfred of Liechtenstein (1842–1907), married his first cousin Princess Henriette Maria of Liechtenstein (1843–1931)
- Princess Josefina Marie Juliane (Vienna, 22 April 1844 – Vienna, 10 October 1854), died young
- Prince Aloys Franz de Paula Maria (Prague, 19 November 1846 – Vienna, 25 March 1920), married firstly in London on 27 June 1872 Marie "Mary" Henriette Adelaide Fox (Paris, 21 December 1850 – Schloss Burgstall, Styria, 26 December 1878), adopted daughter of Henry Edward Fox, 4th Baron Holland, and wife Lady Mary Augusta Coventry, believed to be his own natural daughter, and had issue, four daughters, and married secondly in Vienna on 20 May 1890 Johanna Elisabeth Maria von Klinkosch (Vienna, 13 August 1849 – Baden bei Wien, 31 January 1925), daughter of Joseph Ritter von Klinkosch and wife Elise Swoboda, without issue:
  - Princess Sophie Maria Josepha (Berlin, 29 March 1873 – Graz, 2 March 1947), married in Graz on 31 July 1897 Franz Ürményi d'Ürmény (Ürmény, 14 January 1863 – Baden bei Wien, 20 February 1934), without issue
  - Princess Julie Margarethe Maria (Schloss Burgstall, 20 July 1874 – Mayerling, 3 July 1950), unmarried and without issue
  - Princess Henriette Maria Josefa (Schloss Burgstall, 6 July 1875 – Pertelstein, 21 April 1958), unmarried and without issue
  - Princess Marie Johanna Franziska (Schloss Burgstall, 21 August 1877 – Vienna, 11 January 1939), married in Vienna on 7 June 1902 Franz, Graf von Meran, Freiherr von Brandhofen (Graz, 5 October 1868 - Bad Aussee, 10 November 1949), and had issue
- Prince Heinrich Karl August (Budapest, 6 November 1853 - Vienna, 15 February 1914), unmarried and without issue

== Honours ==
- Knight of the Military Order of Maria Theresa (Austrian Empire, 1850).
- Grand Cross of the Order of the Red Eagle, with Swords (Kingdom of Prussia, 3 March 1864).

== Ancestry ==
Ancestors of Prince Franz de Paula of Liechtenstein

16. Prince Philipp Erasmus of Liechtenstein
8. Prince Emanuel of Liechtenstein
17. Princess Christina of Löwenstein-Wertheim-Rochefort
4. Franz Joseph I, Prince of Liechtenstein
18. Count Karl Ludwig of Dietrichstein
9. Countess Antonia of Dietrichstein-Weichselstädt
19. Countess Maria Theresa Anna of Trauttmansdorff
2. Johann I Joseph, Prince of Liechtenstein
20. Count Franz Damian of Sternberg
10. Count Franz Philipp of Sternberg
21. Countess Maria Josepha of Trauttmansdorff
5. Countess Leopoldine of Sternberg
22. Count Conrad Sigismund of Starhemberg
11. Countess Leopoldine of Starhemberg
23. Princess Maria Leopoldine of Löwenstein-Wertheim-Rochefort
1. Prince Franz de Paula of Liechtenstein
24. Prosper Ferdinand, Landgrave of Fürstenberg-Stühlingen
12. Ludwig August Egon, Landgrave of Fürstenberg-Weitra
25. Countess Sophie of Königsegg-Rothenfels
6. Joachim Egon, Landgrave of Fürstenberg-Weitra
26. Count Maximilian of Kirchberg
13. Countess Maria Anna of Kirchberg
27. Countess Maria Judith of Törring
3. Landgravine Josepha of Fürstenberg-Weitra
28. Count Anton Karl of Oettingen-Wallerstein
14. Count Philipp Karl of Oettingen-Wallerstein
29. Countess Maria Agnes Fugger of Glött
7. Countess Sophia Maria of Oettingen-Wallerstein
30. Kraft Anton, Count of Oettingen-Baldern and Katzenstein
15. Countess Charlotte Juliane of Oettingen-Baldern
31. Countess Maria Eleonora of Schönborn-Buchheim
