= Chrást (Nymburk District) =

- Municipality
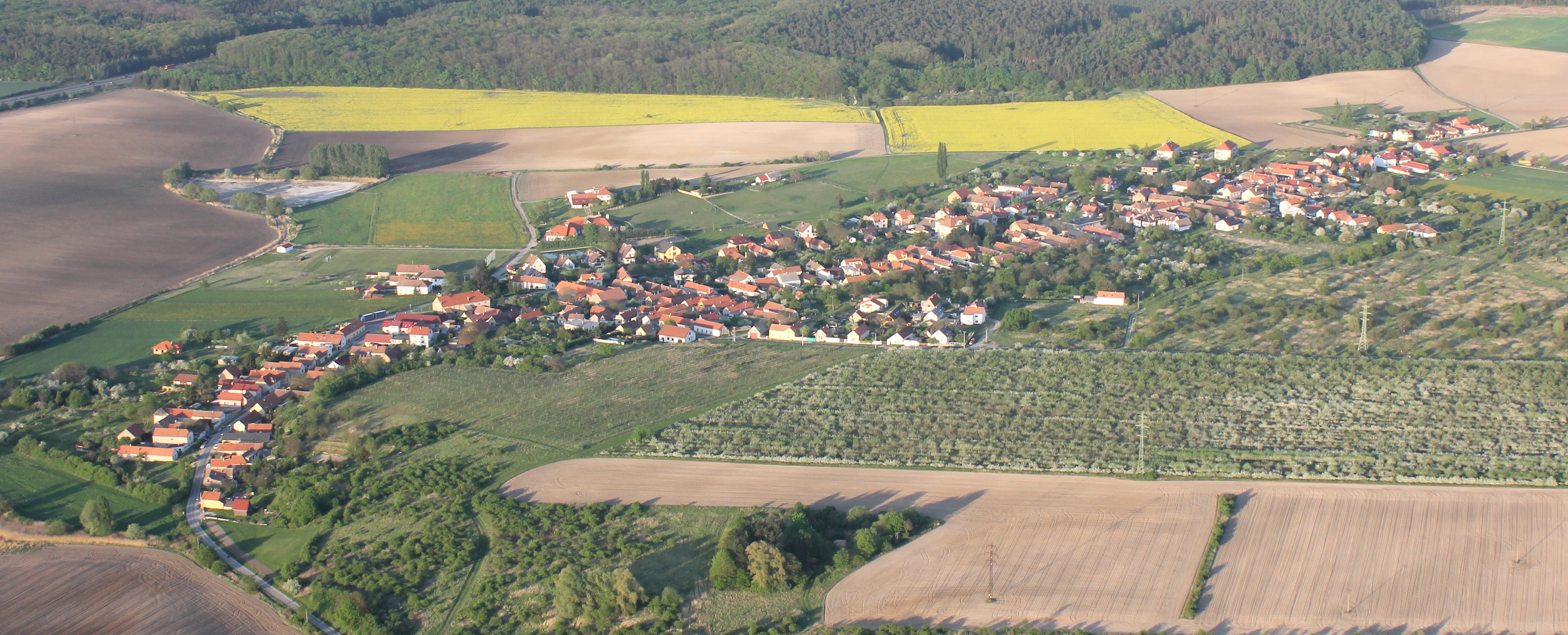
- Aerial view

- Location in the Czech Republic
- Coordinates: 50°7′8″N 14°53′54″E
- Country: Czech Republic
- Region: Central Bohemian
- District: Nymburk
- First mentioned: 1345

Area
  - Total: 4.92 km^{2} (1.90 sq mi)
- Elevation: 223 m (732 ft)

Population (2026-01-01)
  - Total: 538
  - Density: 109/km^{2} (283/sq mi)
- Time zone: UTC+1 (CET)
  - Summer (DST): UTC+2 (CEST)
- Postal code: 289 14
- Website: www.obec-chrast.cz

Chrást (until 1947 Manderšejd-Chrást; German: Manderscheid-Chrast) is a municipality and village in Nymburk District in the Central Bohemian Region of the Czech Republic. It has about 500 inhabitants.

== Etymology ==
The name Chrást is a common Czech place name, meaning 'brushwood' or 'shrubs'.

== Geography ==
Chrást is located about 12 kilometres (7 mi) southwest of Nymburk and 26 km (16 mi) east of Prague. It lies in the Central Elbe Table. The highest point is a nameless hill at 251 m (823 ft) above sea level.

== History ==
The first written mention of Chrást is from 1345. In 1599, the locality belonged to the Kounice estate and was described as abandoned. In 1776, the village was re-established by Prince Franz Joseph I of Liechtenstein. Near Chrást, a new village was founded by Prince Aloys I of Liechtenstein and named Manderšejd after his wife, Princess Karoline of Manderscheid-Blankenheim. Manderšejd grew rapidly and thus merged soon with Chrást.

Until 1921, Manderšejd-Chrást was a municipal part of Kounice. In 1921, it became a separate municipality. From 1947, the municipality is called Chrást.

== Demographics ==
Historical population

Year	Pop.	±%
1869	322	—
1880	449	+39.4%
1890	520	+15.8%
1900	538	+3.5%
1910	608	+13.0%

Year	Pop.	±%
1921	609	+0.2%
1930	646	+6.1%
1950	657	+1.7%
1961	698	+6.2%
1970	619	−11.3%

Year	Pop.	±%
1980	508	−17.9%
1991	429	−15.6%
2001	467	+8.9%
2011	522	+11.8%
2021	536	+2.7%

Source: Censuses

== Transport ==
The D11 motorway (part of the European route E67) from Prague to Hradec Králové runs through the northern part of the municipality.

== Sights ==
There are no protected cultural monuments in the municipality.
