= Johann I Joseph of Liechtenstein =

Prince of Liechtenstein from 1805 to 1836

Johann I Joseph
- Duke of Troppau and Jägerndorf
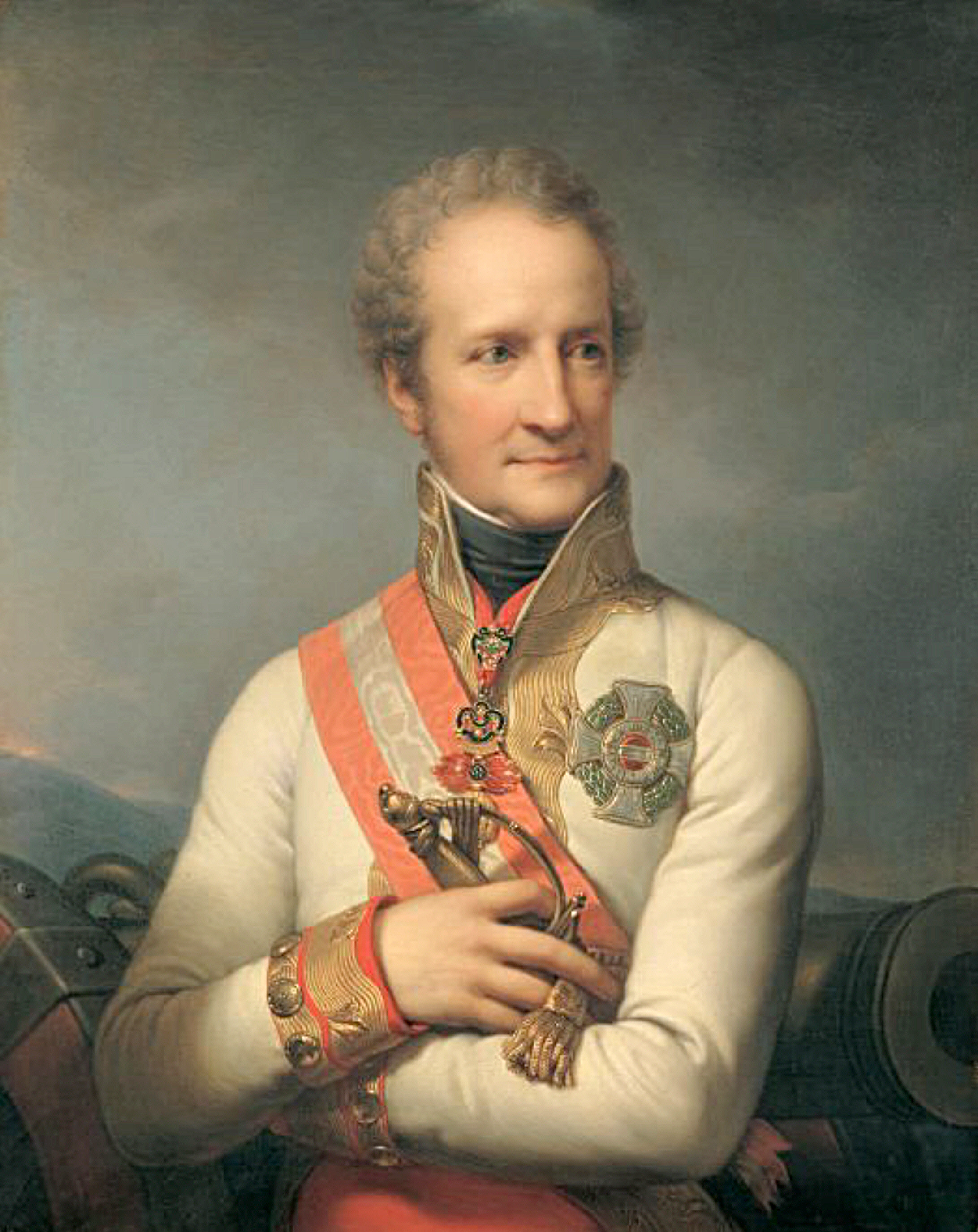
- Portrait by Johann Baptist von Lampi the Elder c. 1816

Prince of Liechtenstein
- Reign: 24 March 1805 – 20 April 1836
- Predecessor: Aloys I
- Successor: Aloys II
- Born: 26 June 1760; Vienna, Archduchy of Austria
- Died: 20 April 1836 (aged 75); Vienna, Austrian Empire
- Burial: Church of the Nativity of the Virgin Mary, Brno
- Spouse: Landgravine Josefa of Fürstenberg-Weitra (m. 1792)
- Issue: Princess Maria Leopoldine; Princess Karoline; Aloys II, Prince of Liechtenstein; Princess Sophie, Countess Esterházy von Galántha; Princess Maria Josepha; Prince Franz de Paula of Liechtenstein; Prince Karl Johann; Princess Klothilda; Princess Henriette, Countess Hunyady von Kethély; Prince Friedrich Adalbert; Prince Eduard Franz; Prince August; Ida, Princess Paar; Prince Rudolf
Names
- Johann Baptist Josef Adam Johann Nepomuk Aloys Franz de Paula
- House: Liechtenstein
- Father: Franz Joseph I
- Mother: Leopoldine von Sternberg
- Religion: Roman Catholic

Johann I Joseph (Johann Baptist Josef Adam Johann Nepomuk Aloys Franz de Paula; 26 June 1760 – 20 April 1836) was Prince of Liechtenstein between 1805 and 1806 and again from 1814 until 1836. He was the last Liechtenstein prince to rule under the Holy Roman Empire between 1805 and 1806 and as regent of Liechtenstein from 1806 until 1814. He was the fourth son of Franz Joseph I, Prince of Liechtenstein.

== Early life ==
He was the fourth son of Franz Joseph I and Countess Leopoldine von Sternberg. His two eldest brothers died young while his next eldest brother, Aloys I, Prince of Liechtenstein, married Countess Karoline von Manderscheid-Blankenheim but died childless in 1805.

His paternal grandparents were Prince Emanuel of Liechtenstein and Maria Anna Antonia, Countess of Dietrichstein-Weichselstädt, Baroness zu Hollenburg und Finkenstein. His mother was the eldest daughter of Count Franz Philipp of Sternberg and Countess Leopoldine of Starhemberg (elder sister of Georg Adam, Prince of Starhemberg).

== Career ==
Johann chose a military career and at age 21 entered the army as a lieutenant in a cuirassier regiment. In the year 1785 Johann joined the Freemason lodge in Vienna. During the Austro-Turkish War (1788–1791) he earned, in rapid succession, promotion to Major, Oberstleutnant, and Oberst (colonel). He earned renown as a good cavalry officer and was honored with the Knight's Cross of the Military Order of Maria Theresa in 1790.

=== French Revolutionary Wars ===
During the French Revolutionary Wars, he participated in an "outstandingly effective cavalry action" at Avesnes-le-Sec on 12 September 1793, where 4,663 Republican troops suffered losses of 2,000 killed and wounded with the Allies losing only 69 men. In addition, 2,000 soldiers and 20 artillery pieces were captured. He also participated in many other battles. Soon after being promoted to General-Major in June 1794, he fought at the Battle of Fleurus. He commanded a mixed cavalry-infantry brigade in Anton Sztaray's division at the Battle of Würzburg on 3 September 1796. After this action he was awarded the Commander's Cross of the Order of Maria Theresa.

In the War of the Second Coalition, Liechtenstein commanded the Austrian Reserve at the Battle of Trebbia. In August 1799 he received promotion to Feldmarschal-Leutnant. He commanded 8,000 men in the successful siege of Cuneo in November and December. On 3 December 1800, he led a 5,109-man cavalry division in the Battle of Hohenlinden.

=== Napoleonic Wars ===
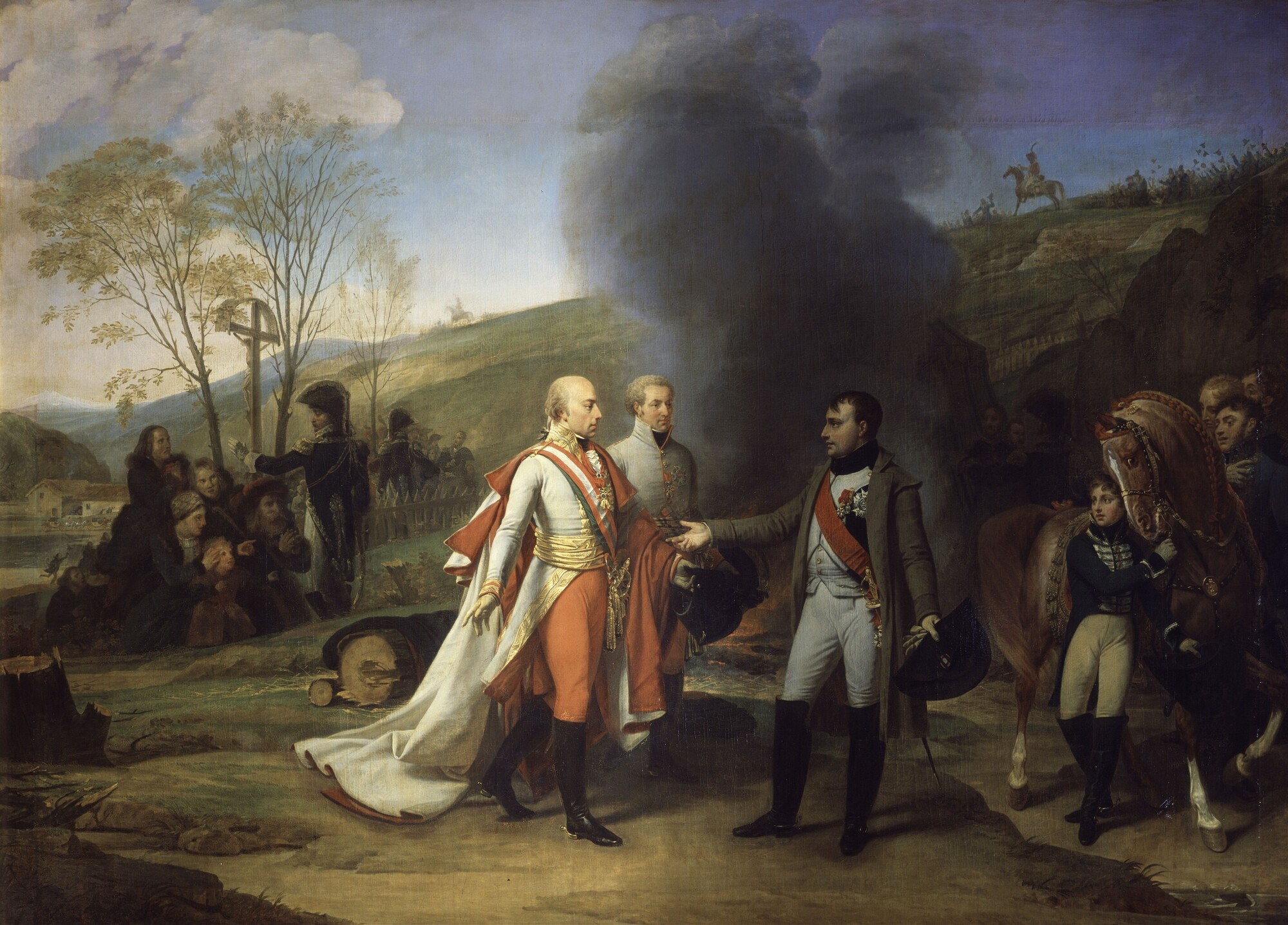
Interview Between Napoleon and Francis II after the Battle of Austerlitz by Antoine-Jean Gros, 1812. Liechtenstein is pictured between the two emperors.

Liechtenstein was prominent in the Napoleonic Wars. At the Battle of Austerlitz, he led the 4,600 cavalry of the 5th Column. His troops fought well but he was unable to save the Austrian-Russian army from a disastrous defeat. Afterward, he carried on the negotiations with Emperor Napoleon I which concluded with the Peace of Pressburg. He earned the rank of General of Cavalry in 1808.

Throughout the War of the Fifth Coalition Liechtenstein commanded the I Reserve Korps in the army of Archduke Charles. He led his cavalry and grenadiers at the Battle of Eckmühl on 22 April 1809, the Battle of Aspern-Essling on 21–22 May, and the Battle of Wagram on 5–6 July. He took command of the main army after Archduke Charles resigned and held this responsibility until the end of the year. Emperor Francis II promoted him Feldmarschall in September. He negotiated and signed the Peace of Schönbrunn. Both of these treaties were very favourable to Napoleon and hard on Austria. Afterward, Liechtenstein was accused of having little diplomatic skill. To escape criticism he resigned from the military in 1810.

=== Sovereign of Liechtenstein ===
As Prince of Liechtenstein, Johann made forward-thinking reforms, but also had an absolutist governing style. In 1818 he granted a constitution, although it was limited in its nature. He expanded agriculture and forestry and radically reorganized his administration, in an attempt to take the requirements of what was then a modern estate into account.

He proved a trendsetter in the area of garden art by planting Biedermeier gardens and park landscapes in an English model.

In 1806 Napoleon incorporated Liechtenstein in the Confederation of the Rhine and made it a sovereign state. At the Vienna Congress the sovereignty of Liechtenstein was approved. Liechtenstein became a member of the German Confederation in 1815. This membership confirmed Liechtenstein's sovereignty.

== Personal life ==
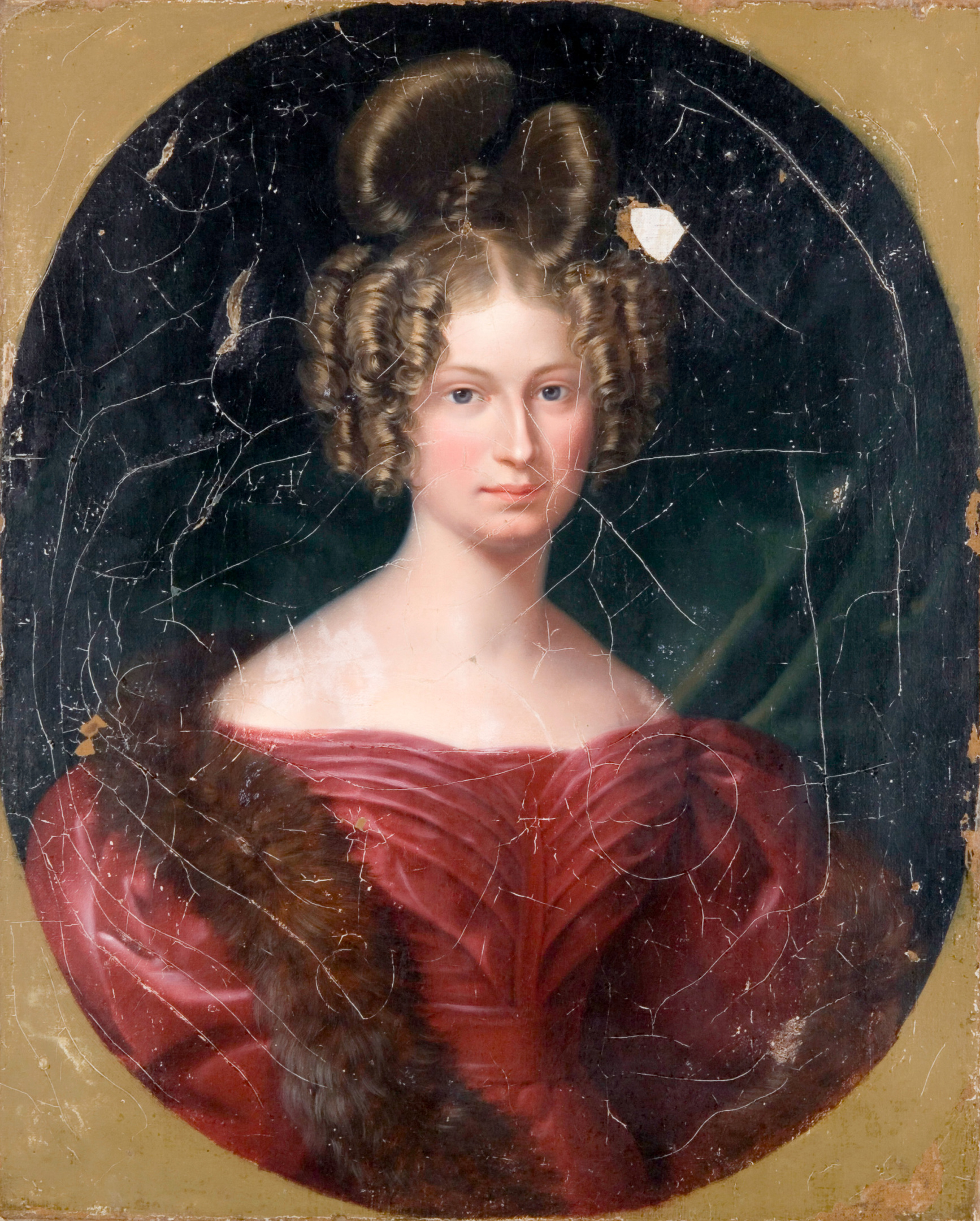
Portrait of his daughter, Princess Ida, wife of the 4th Prince Paar

On 12 April 1792 in Vienna, he married Landgravine Josefa of Fürstenberg-Weitra (1776–1848), Dame of the Imperial Court and Dame of the Order of the Starry Cross. She was a daughter of Joachim Egon, Landgrave of Fürstenberg-Weitra, and Countess Sophia Maria of Oettingen-Wallerstein. Together, they had fourteen children:

- Princess Maria Leopoldine Josepha Sophia Aemiliana (1793–1808), who died young.
- Princess Karoline (1795–1795), who died in infancy.
- Aloys II, Prince of Liechtenstein (1796–1858), who married Countess Franziska Kinsky of Wchinitz and Tettau in 1831.
- Princess Maria Sophie Josepha (1798–1869), who married Count Vincenz Esterházy von Galántha in Vienna in 1817.
- Princess Maria Josepha (1800–1884), who died unmarried and without issue.
- Prince Franz de Paula of Liechtenstein (1802–1887), who married Countess Julia Potocka and had issue; his great-grandson would eventually become Prince Franz Joseph II.
- Prince Karl Johann of Liechtenstein (1803–1871), who married Countess Rosalie d'Hemricourt von Grünne and had issue.
- Princess Klothilda Leopoldina Josepha (1804–1807), who died young.
- Princess Henriette (1806–1886), who married Count Joseph Hunyady von Kethély in Vienna in 1825.
- Prince Friedrich Adalbert (1807–1885), 1,018th Knight of the Order of the Golden Fleece in Austria; he married Johanna Sophie Christiane Löwe in 1848 at Schloss Rosegg.
- Prince Eduard Franz of Liechtenstein (1809–1864), who married Countess Honoria Choloniowa-Choloniewska.
- Prince August Ludwig Ignaz (1810–1824), who died unmarried.
- Princess Ida Leopoldine Sophie Marie Josephine Franziska (1811–1884), a Dame of the Imperial Court, Dame of the Order of the Starry Cross; she married Karl, 4th Prince Paar von Hartberg und Krottenstein in Vienna in 1832.
- Prince Rudolf Maria Franz Placidus (1816–1848), who unmarried and without issue.

The Prince died on 20 April 1836 in Vienna. He was succeeded as reigning prince by his eldest son, Aloys II.

== Honours ==
- Habsburg Monarchy:
  - Knight of the Military Order of Maria Theresa, 19 December 1790; Commander, 1796; Grand Cross, 1801
  - 869th Knight of the Order of the Golden Fleece, 1801
- Russian Empire: Knight of the Order of St. George, 3rd Class, 7 October 1813

== Footnotes ==
Johann I Joseph of Liechtenstein House of Liechtenstein Born: 26 June 1760 Died: 20 April 1836
Regnal titles
Preceded by Aloys I	Prince of Liechtenstein; 1805–1836	Succeeded by Aloys II
