= Sophie of Liechtenstein =

Sophie of Liechtenstein may refer to the following princesses named Sophie:

- Princess Sophie of Liechtenstein, Countess Esterházy von Galántha (1798–1869), Austrian Chief Court Mistress
- Princess Sophie of Liechtenstein (1837–1899), Princess Consort of Löwenstein-Wertheim
- Sophie, Hereditary Princess of Liechtenstein (born 1967)
