= Interview Between Napoleon and Francis II after the Battle of Austerlitz =

Painting by Antoine-Jean Gros

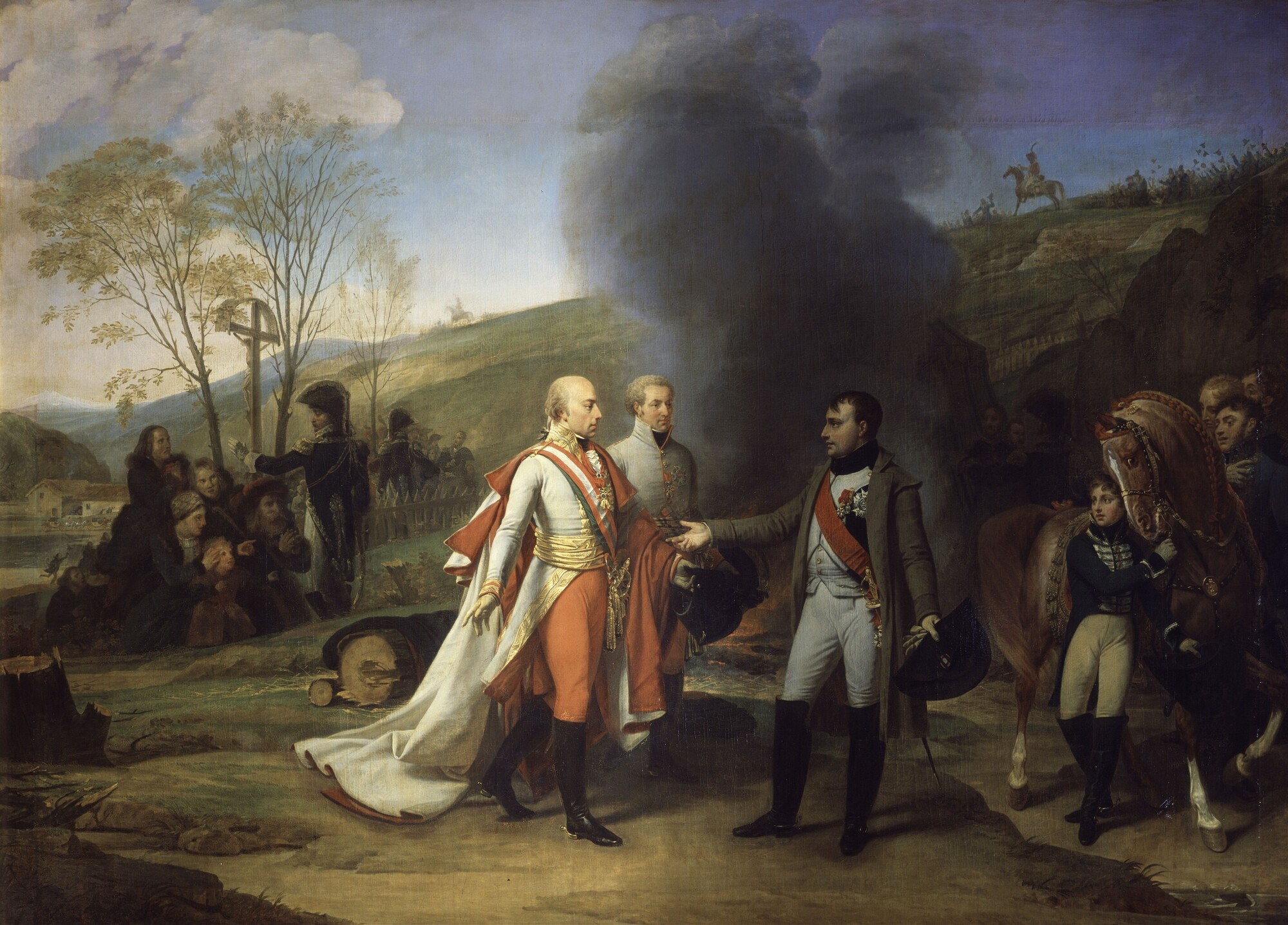
- Artist: Antoine-Jean Gros
- Year: 1812
- Type: Oil on canvas, history painting
- Dimensions: 380 cm × 532 cm (150 in × 209 in)
- Location: Palace of Versailles; Versailles

Interview Between Napoleon and Francis II after the Battle of Austerlitz (French: Entrevue de Napoléon Ier et de François II après la bataille d'Austerlitz) is an 1812 history painting by the French artist Antoine-Jean Gros. It portrays the meeting of Napoleon, Emperor of France, and Francis II of Austria in the aftermath of the Battle of Austerlitz in December 1805. Francis requested an interview to discuss terms a day after Napoleon's crushing victory over Austria and its Russian allies. The meeting took place in the Moravian countryside about ten miles south of the battlefield and agreed an immediate armistice to be followed by the Treaty of Pressburg a few weeks later.

The Austrian emperor is accompanied by the Prince of Liechtenstein. It was part of a major commission from several artists depicting the glories of the Napoleonic era. The work was intended to be ready for the Salon of 1808, but was not finally completed and exhibited until the Salon of 1812. By the time the work was exhibited Francis was Napoleon's father-in-law following the latter's marriage to Marie Louise. The following year, however Austria joined the alliance against Napoleon and declared war on France.

Today the painting is in the collection of the Palace of Versailles. The Library of Congress holds an engraved print based on the work by Ferdinand Delannoy.

== Bibliography ==
- Fisher, Todd. The Napoleonic Wars: The Rise of the Emperor 1805-1807
- Wagar, Chip. Double Emperor: The Life and Times of Francis of Austria. Rowman & Littlefield, 2018.
