= Maria Josepha Hermengilde Esterházy =

19th century German noblewoman

Maria Josepha of Liechtenstein
- Princess Esterházy of Galántha
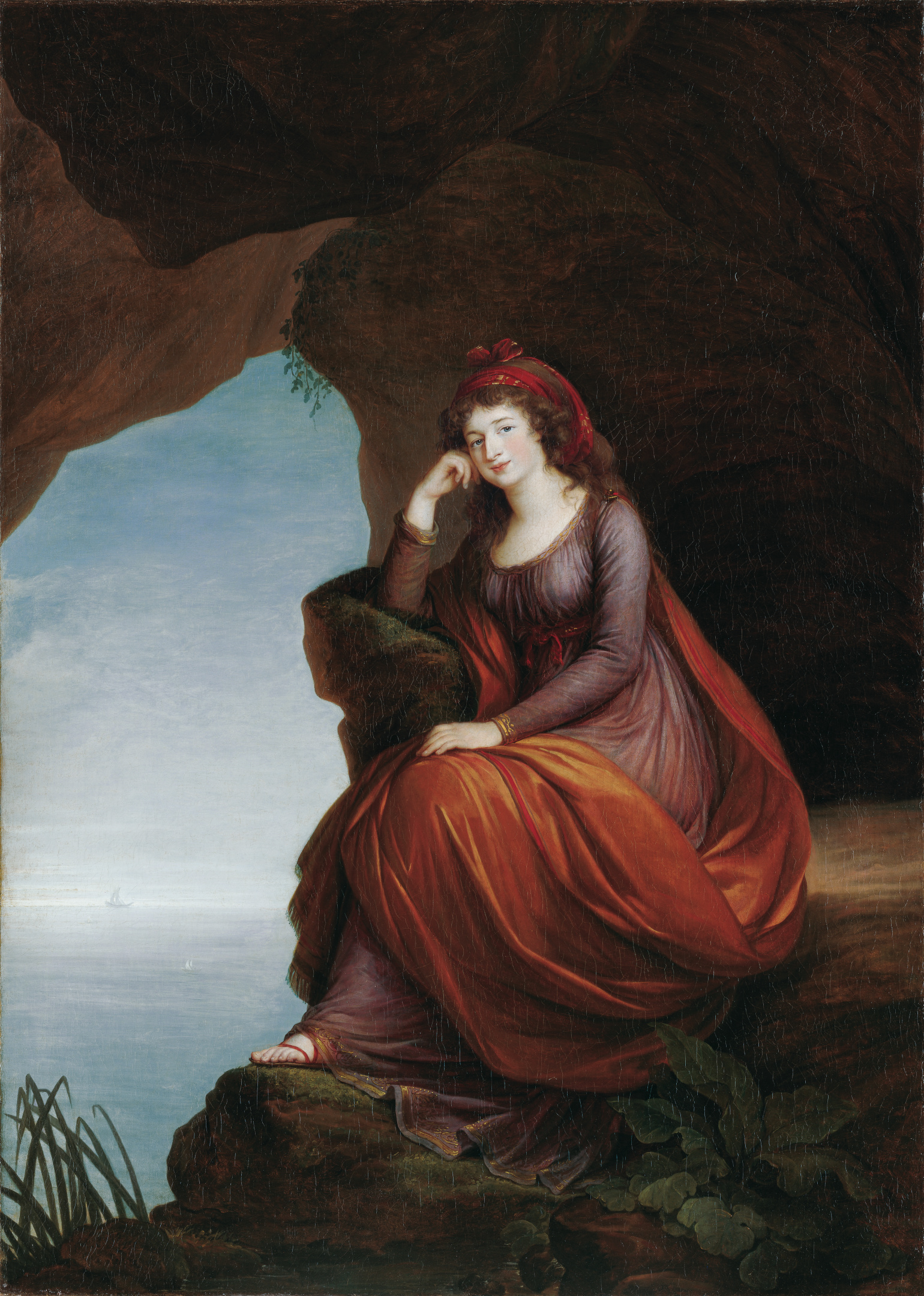
- Princess Maria Esterházy as Ariadne on Naxos, portrait by Elisabeth Vigée Le Brun, 1793

Princess Esterházy of Galántha
- Tenure: 15 September 1783 – 15 November 1833
- Born: 13 April 1768; Vienna, Holy Roman Empire
- Died: 8 August 1845 (aged 77); Hütteldorf, Penzing, Vienna
- Spouse: Nikolaus II, Prince Esterházy (m. 1783; died 1833)
- Issue: Paul III Anton, Prince Esterházy; Princess Leopoldine Esterházy
Names
- German: Maria Josepha Hermengilde Liechtenstein
- House: Liechtenstein
- Father: Franz Joseph I, Prince of Liechtenstein
- Mother: Leopoldine von Sternberg

Princess Maria Josepha Hermengilde Esterházy de Galantha (née von Liechtenstein, 13 April, 1768 — 8 August, 1845) was an aristocrat and patron of music.

== Early life ==
Maria Josepha von Liechtenstein was the daughter of Franz Josef I of Liechtenstein and Leopoldine von Sternberg. On 15 September 1783 she married Prince Nikolaus II Esterházy de Galantha, who in 1794 became the Prince of Esterházy. They married at her family home, because her mother was unwell, and were blessed by Cardinal Bathiany. The marriage contract specified thousands of guilders to be provided for the Princess.

The Princess was positively perceived by her peers, described as very talkative and charming, and having finer jewels than the crown. She was close friends with Maria Ludovica Beatrix, the Austrian Empress, with whom she exchanged intimate letters.

In 1785 she had a son, Paul Anton and in 1788 a daughter, Leopoldine.

== Patron of music ==
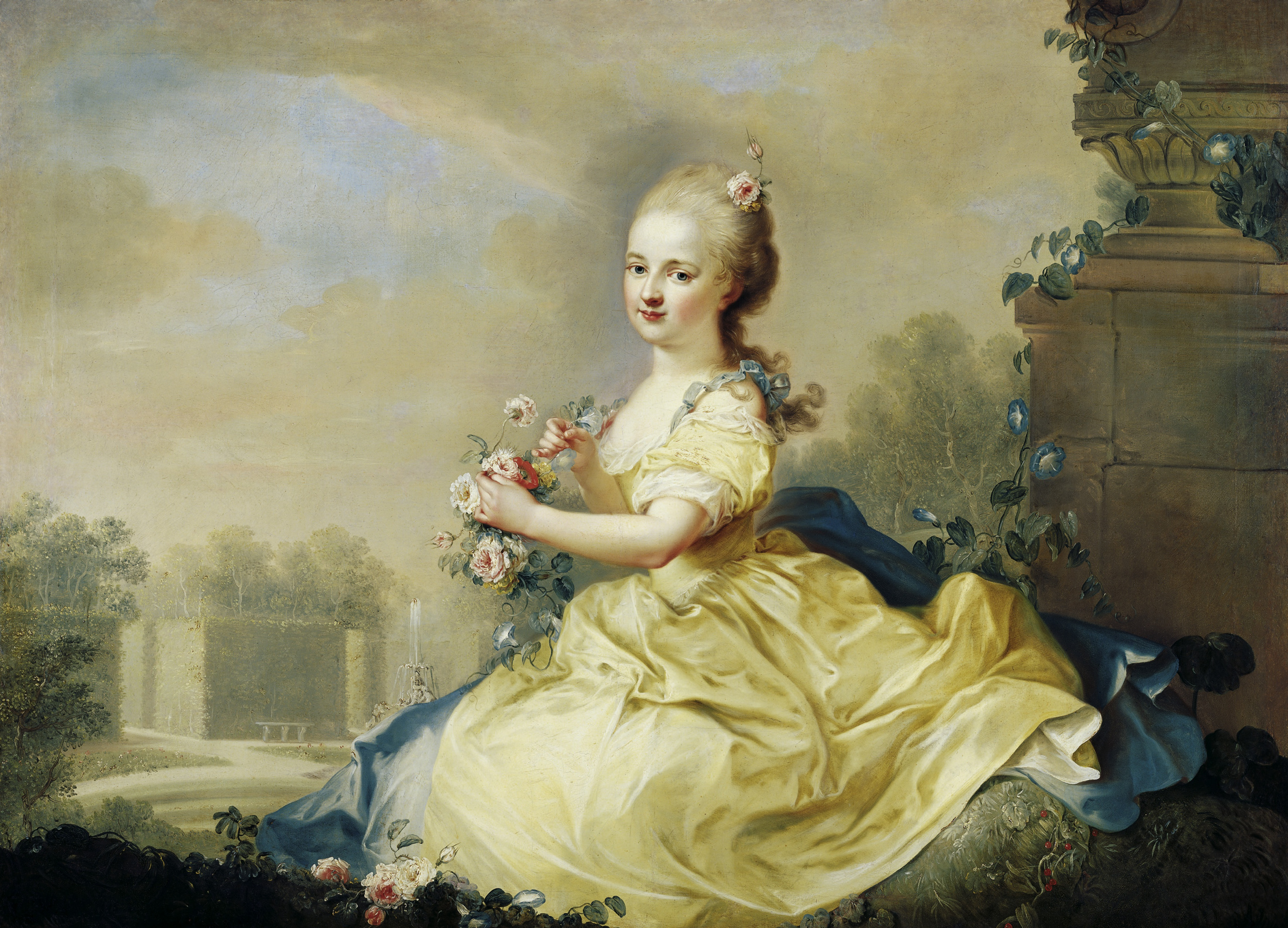
Young Princess Maria Josepha von Liechtenstein by August Friedrich Oelenhainz, 1776

Princess Esterházy was a patron of artists, and especially of Joseph Haydn, who from 1796 to 1802 was commissioned to write a yearly Mass to be performed on her nameday (8 September, the Nativity of the BVM). Thus originated the Heiligmesse (1796), Paukenmesse (1797), Nelsonmesse (1798), Theresienmesse (1799), Schöpfungsmesse (1801) and Harmoniemesse (1802). She may have had lessons from Haydn soon after her marriage. In 1808, she sat beside Haydn at a concert in honour of his birthday, and when she covered him with her shawl, believing him to be cold, she was copied by many of the other nobility present.

For her 1807 nameday, Ludwig van Beethoven composed his Mass in C major, op. 86.

Johann Nepomuk Hummel wrote five Masses for her nameday: Mass in E-flat major, Op. 80 (1804), Mass in D minor, WoO. 13 (1805), Mass in C major, WoO. 12 (1806), Mass in B-flat major, Op. 77 (1808) & Mass in D major, Op. 111 (1810)

One final Mass was written by Jan Ladislav Dussek, Missa Solomnelle in G major, C. 256 (1811).

== Diplomacy and the Congress of Vienna ==
Maria Josepha became very close with her daughter-in-law, Princess Maria Theresia of Thurn and Taxis. For the 1814-5 Congress of Vienna, they collaborated to host a bal d'enfants or children's ball, which was attended by major aristocratic and diplomatic families.
