= Peter Edward Stroehling =

German painter (1768 – c. 1826)

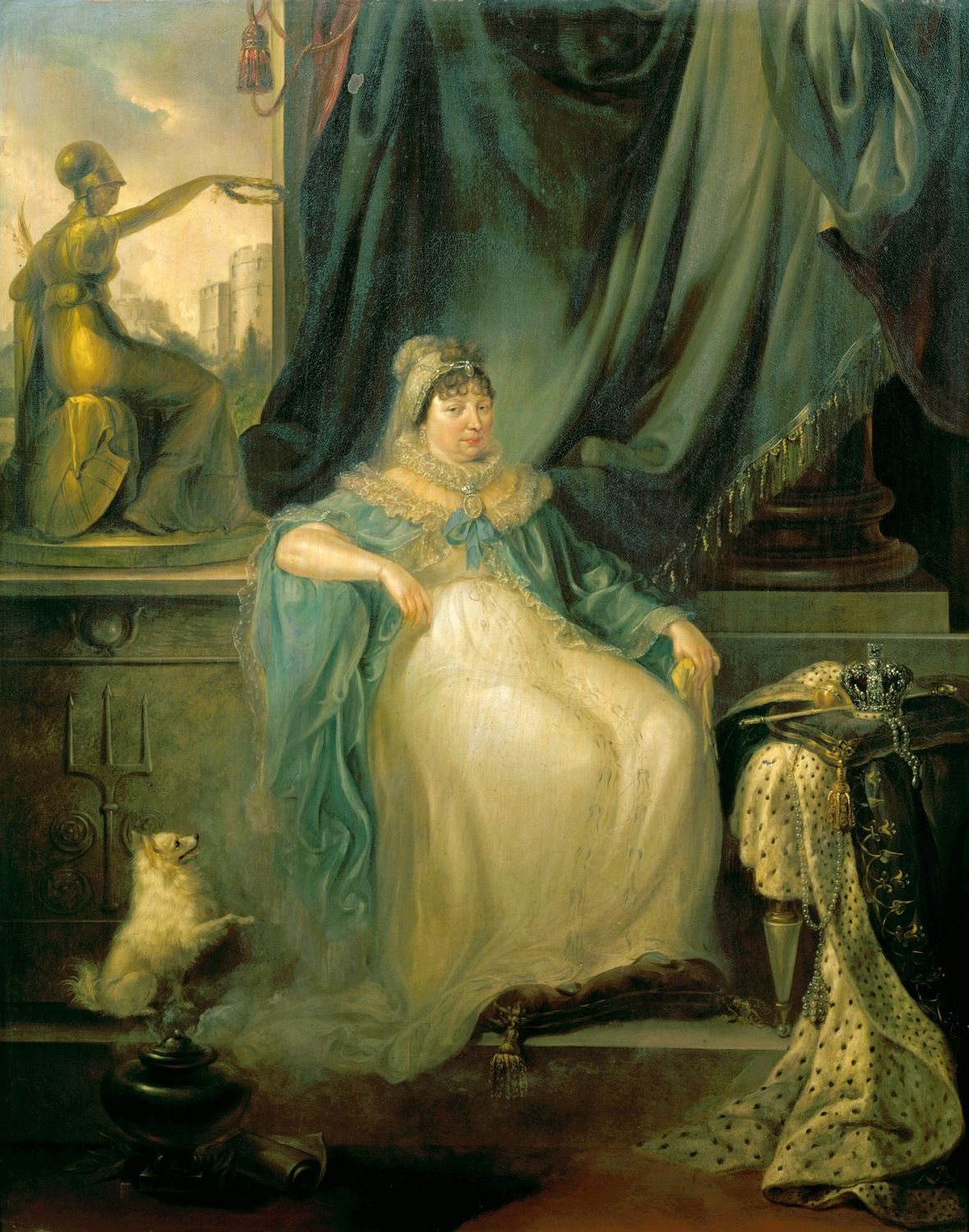
Queen Charlotte in 1807 by Stroehling

Peter Edward Stroehling, also spelled Peter Eduard Ströhling, and sometimes Stroely or Straely (1768 – c. 1826), was a portrait artist from either Germany or the Russian Empire who spent his later years based in London. He worked in oils and in miniature and painted a number of royal portraits.

== Life ==
According to most accounts, Stroehling was born in 1768 in Düsseldorf. However, one biographer states that he was a Russian of German descent, educated at the expense of Catherine the Great. He worked in Paris, Mannheim, Frankfurt, and Mainz, and by about 1792 was studying in Italy. Early in 1796, he was in Vienna and the same year travelled to Saint Petersburg to attend the coronation of Paul I of Russia, taking with him a retinue of servants and representing himself as an English nobleman. He subsequently gained much portrait work in Saint Petersburg and stayed there until 1801.

From 1803 to 1807, he was in London, where like Johann Zoffany, he foresaw significantly better opportunities to make his name and fortune than at a German court, and was there again from 1819 to 1826. He exhibited his work at the Royal Academy between 1803 and 1826.

Stroehling was uncertainly reported to have died in London about 1826, and no new work was exhibited after that date.

== Work ==
Stroehling painted portraits and historical figures, both in oils and in miniature media. His work is almost always less than life-size.

Notable commissions include a portrait of Queen Louise of Prussia, which was acquired by the Hohenzollern Museum in Berlin, and one of King George III at Windsor Castle with an adoring spaniel, painted in 1807 and now in the Royal Collection. The same year he painted an unflattering portrait of the king's wife, Queen Charlotte (illustrated), which was owned by Queen Elizabeth II. His painting of Aloys I, Prince of Liechtenstein, is in the Liechtenstein Museum, Vienna.

Stroehling's image of the poet Ludwig Achim von Arnim is among his best-known work and is also the only well-known likeness of its subject. He also painted the Duke of Wellington, Prince Augustus Frederick, Duke of Sussex, Princess Augusta Sophia, Princess Elizabeth, and the Italian contralto Giuseppina Grassini.

== Publications ==
- P. E. Stroehling, Original Sketches drawn upon stone (London; printed by G. J. Vollweiler at the polyautographic office No. 9, Buckingham Place, Fitzroy Square)

== Gallery ==
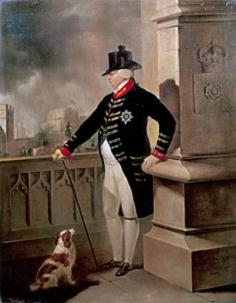
George III

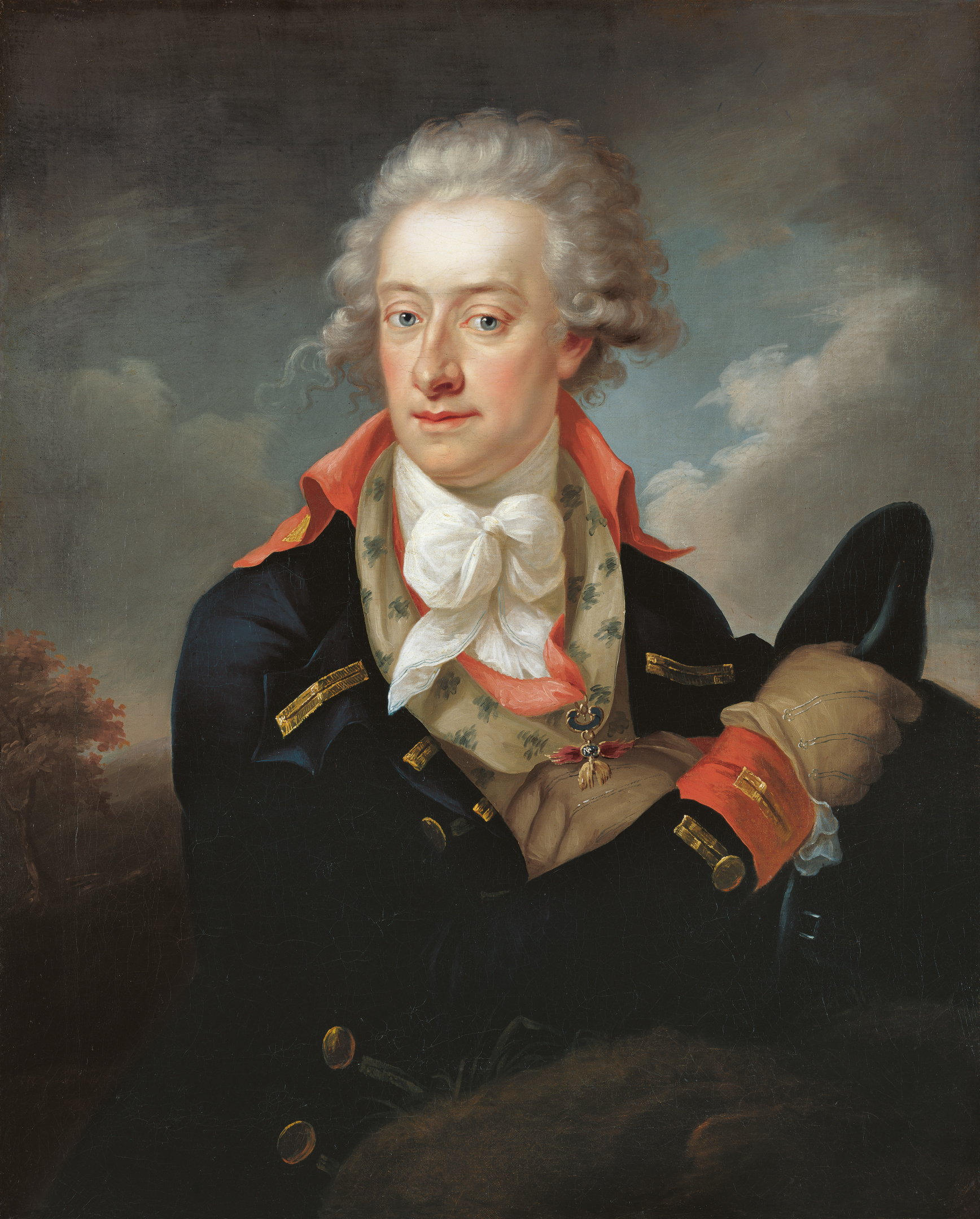
Aloys I, Prince of Liechtenstein

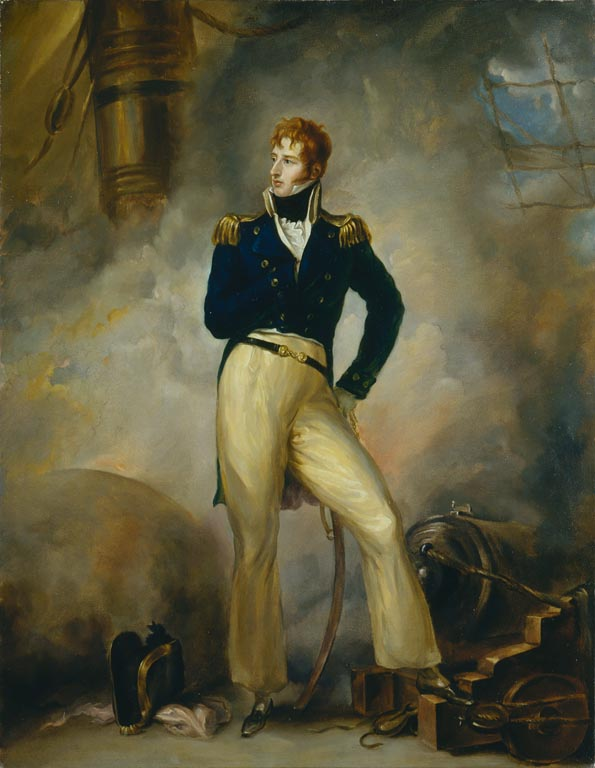
Thomas Cochrane, 10th Earl of Dundonald

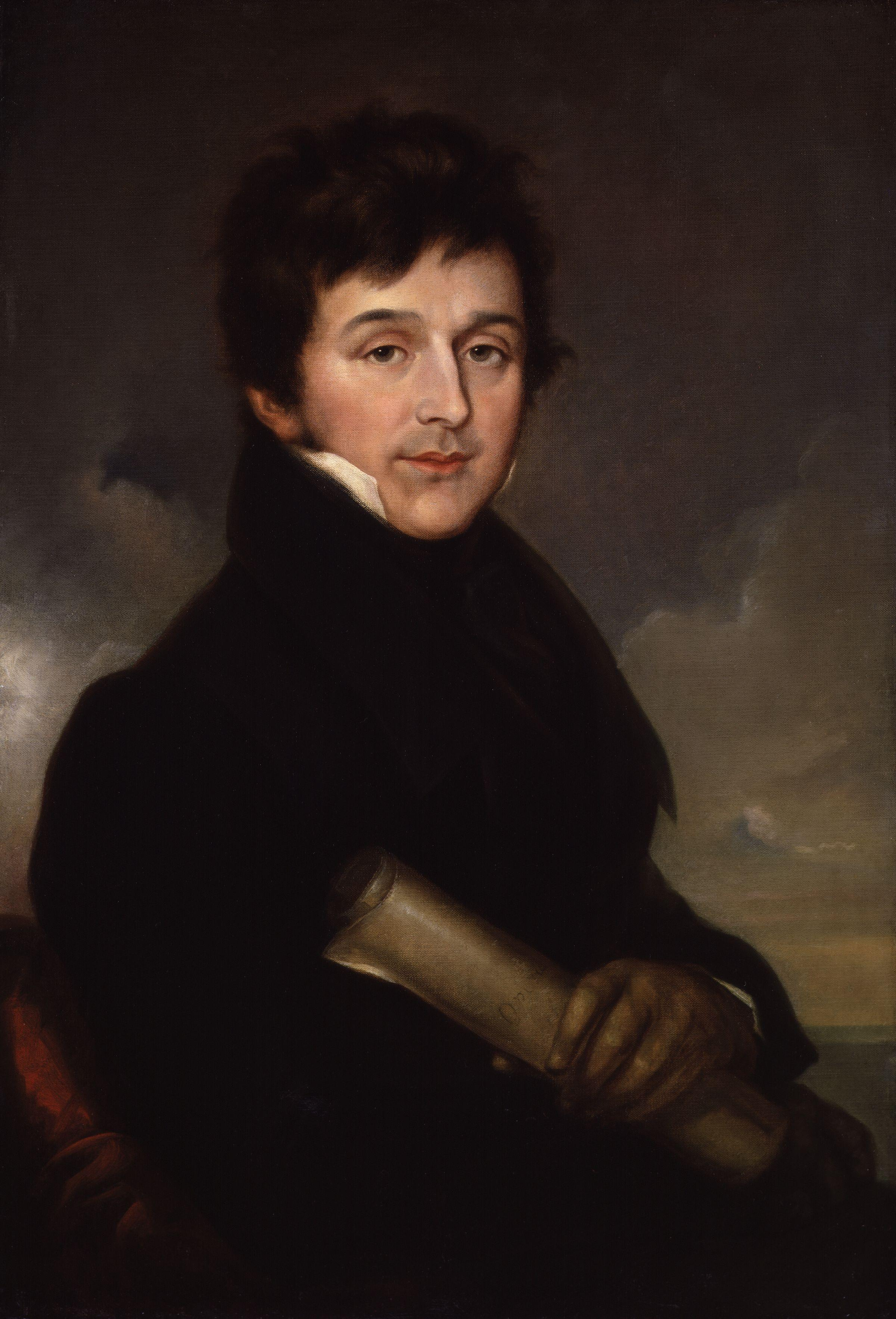
Charles Edward Horn

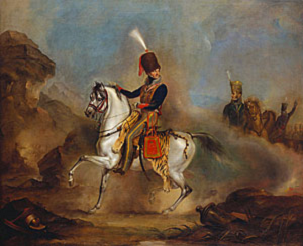
Henry Paget, 1st Marquess of Anglesey

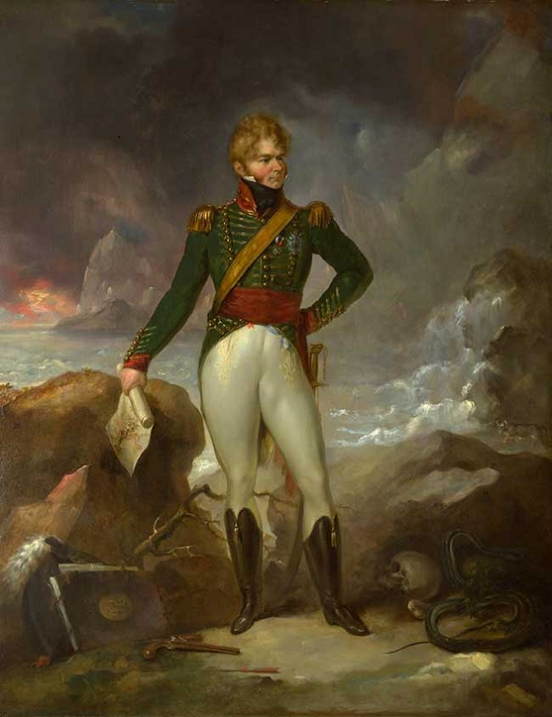
George de Lacy Evans

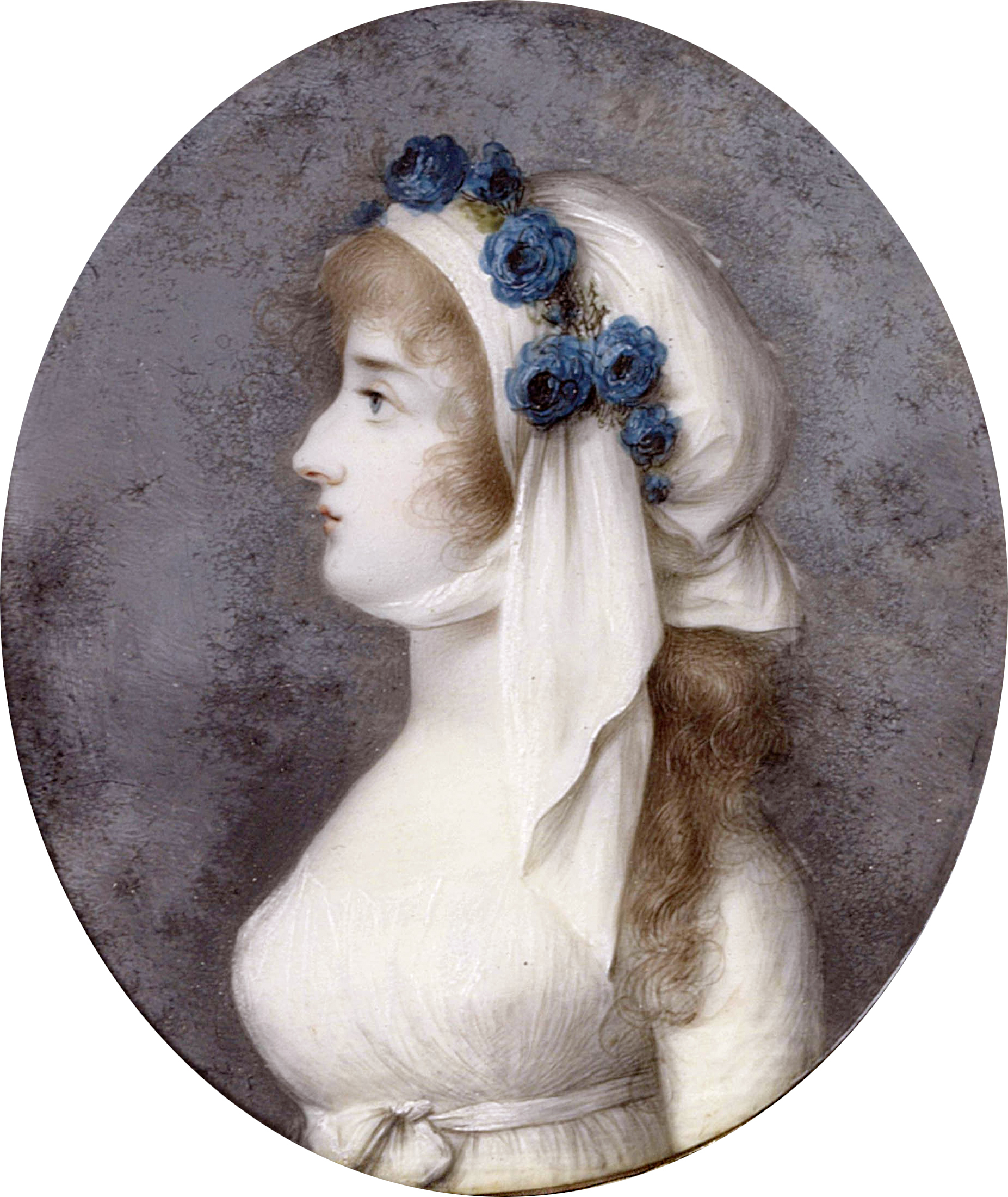
Elizabeth Shakhovskaya

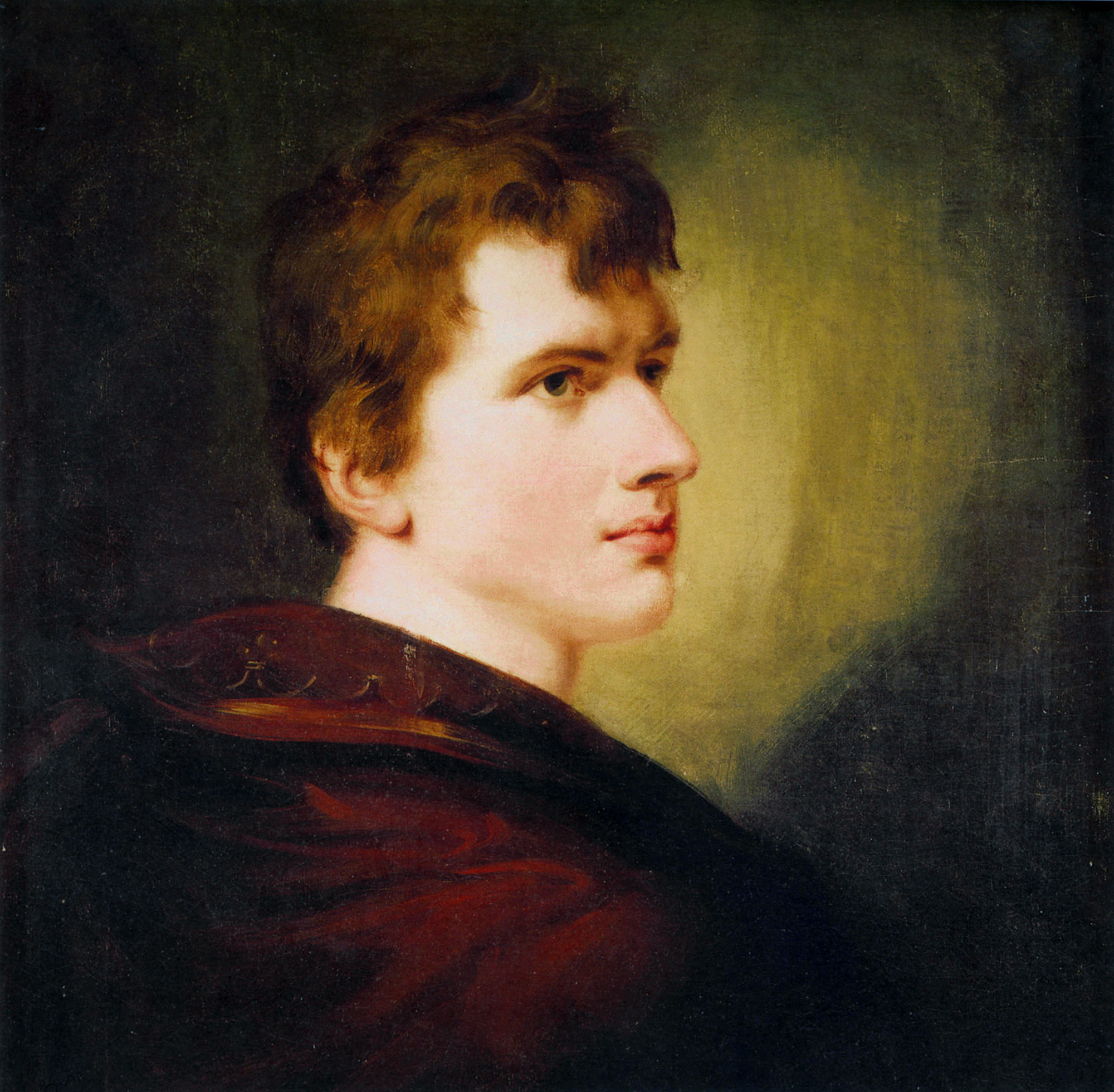
Achim von Arnim

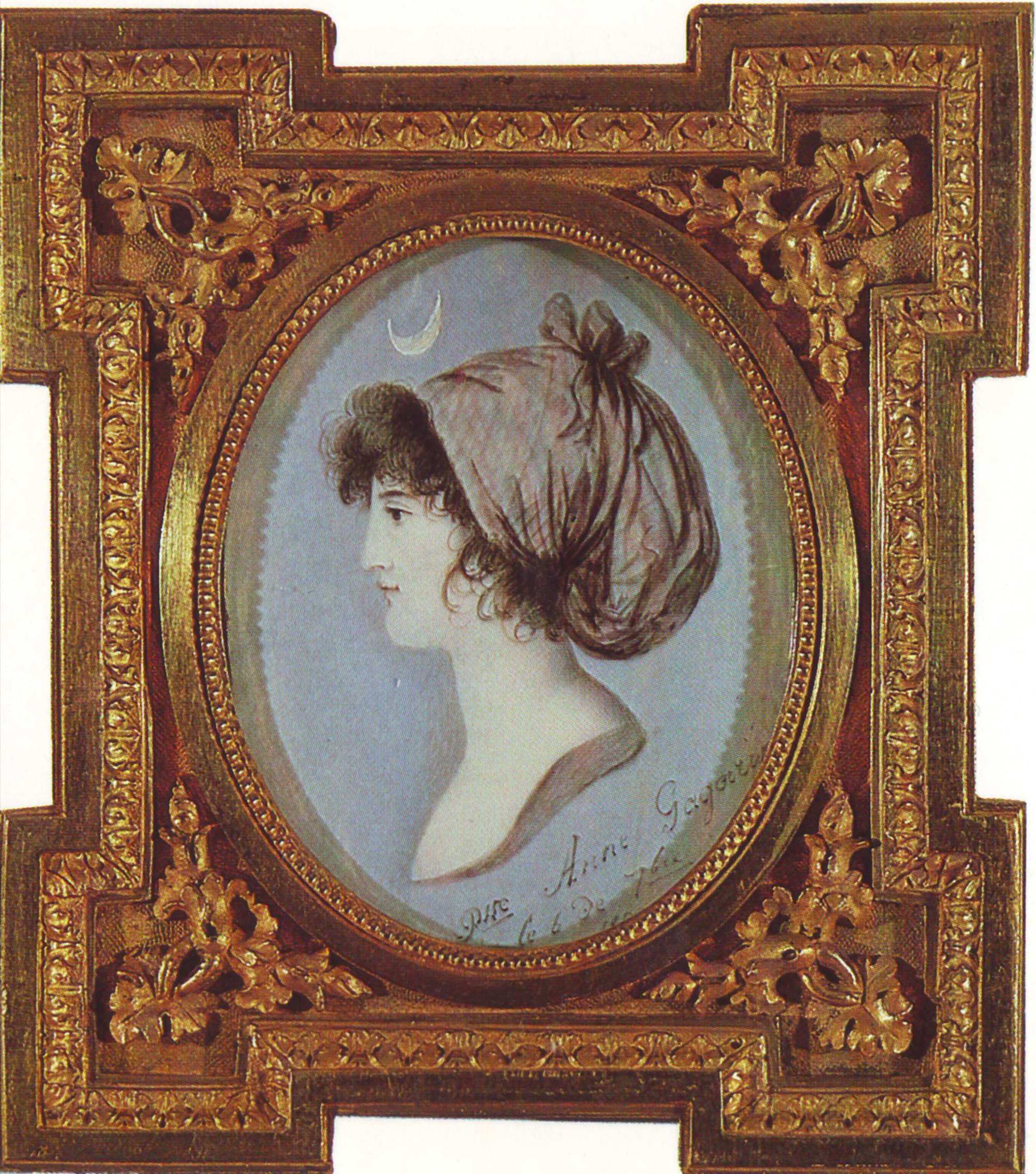
Anna Lopukhina, 1800

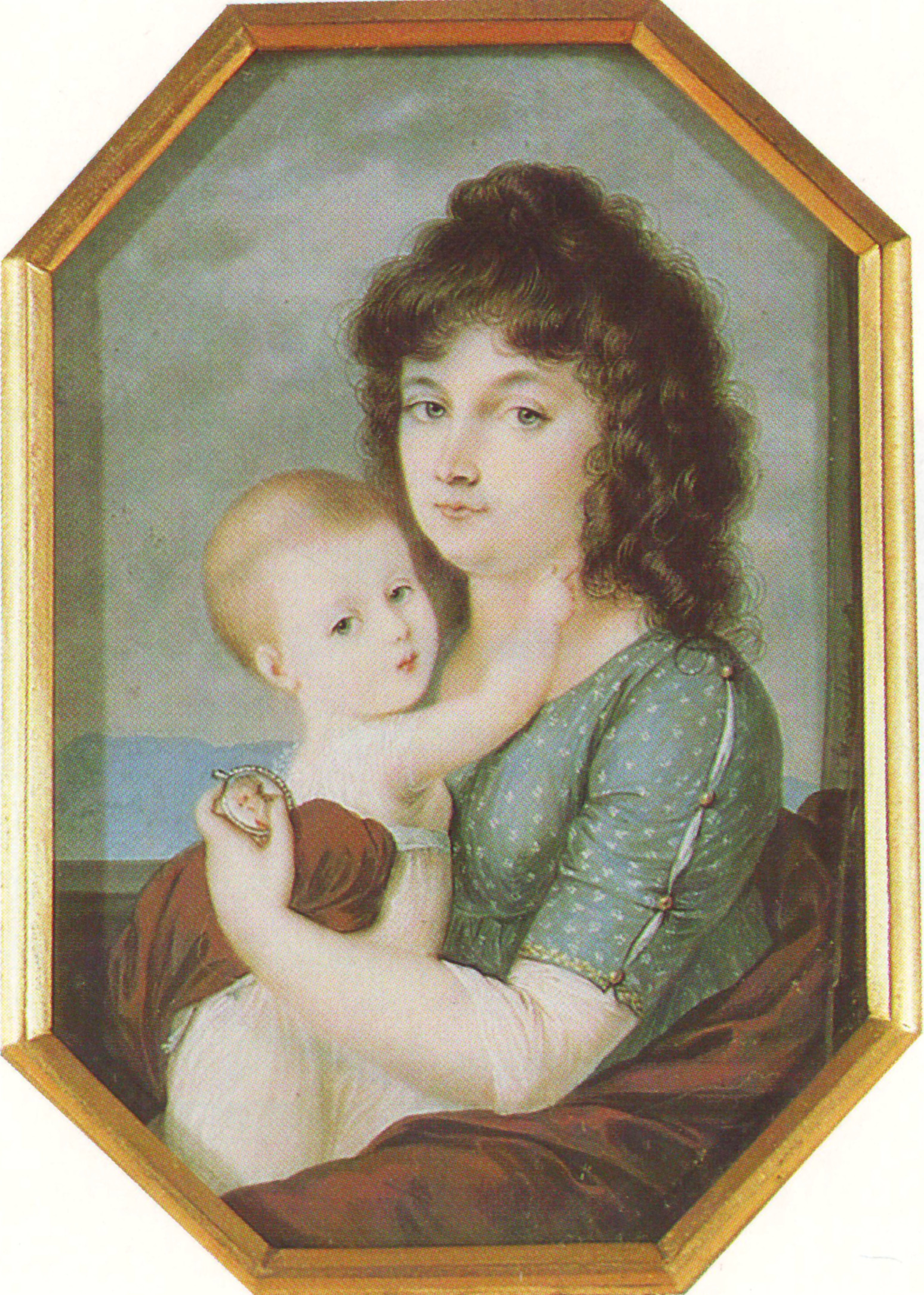
Marija Alekseevna Senjavina ca. 1798

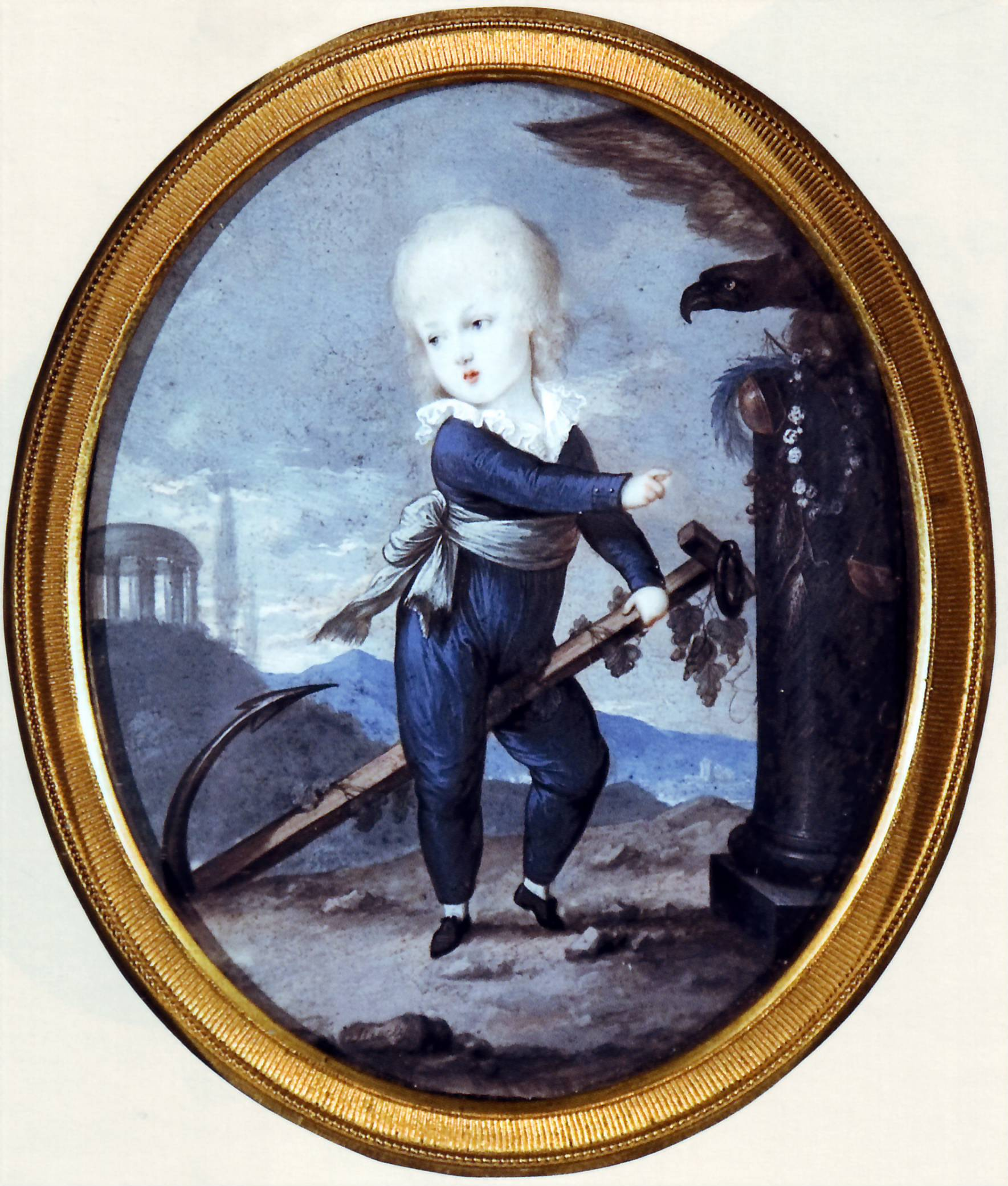
Unknown boy

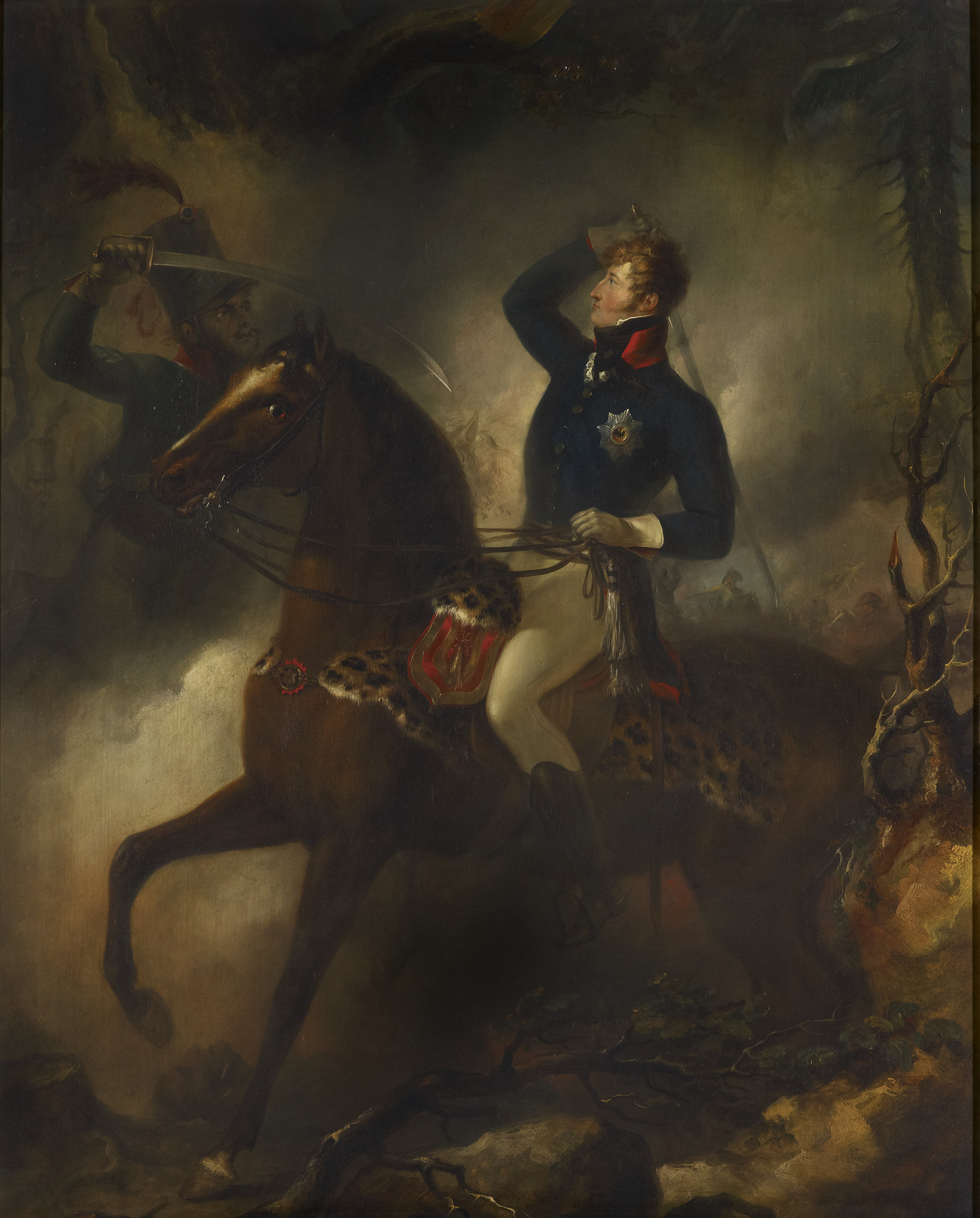
The Death of Prince Louis Ferdinand of Prussia

Princess Caroline (of Brunswick), ca. 1804
