= Pauline von Königsegg =

Austrian court official and lady-in-waiting

Countess Pauline Marie von Königsegg-Aulendorf (1830–1912), was an Austrian noblewoman and Imperial court official.

== Early life ==
Pauline Marie was born as younger daughter of Count August von Bellegarde (1795–1873) and Baroness Julia von Gudenus (1795–1865). She was paternal granddaughter of Count Heinrich von Bellegarde, who served as Viceroy of Lombardy-Venetia.

== Court life ==
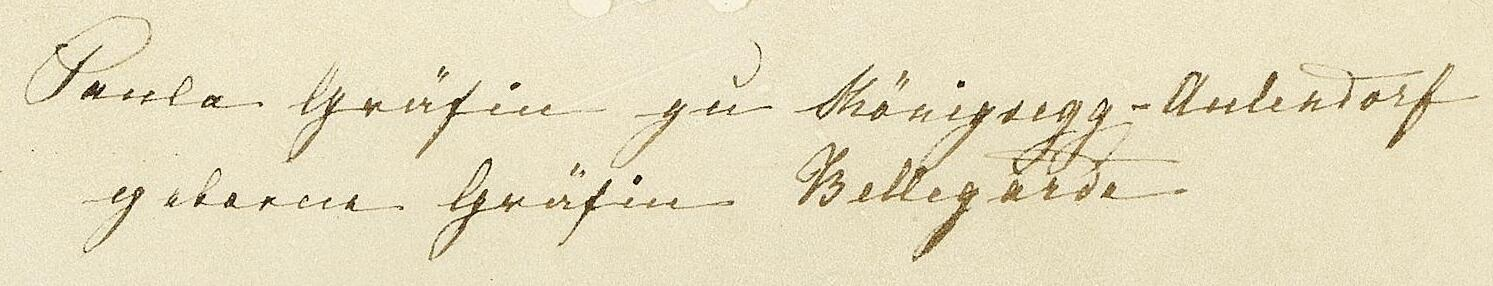
Countess Pauline's signature (1876)

She was the lady in waiting to Empress Elisabeth of Austria, later promoted to the position of Oberhofmeisterin, where she replaced Countess Sophie Esterházy, a friend and close confidant of Archduchess Sophie.

She was a favorite and confidant of the Empress Sissi. Countess Pauline was later awarded with an Order of the Starry Cross.

== Personal life ==
On 15 April 1857 in Vienna, she married Count Alfred zu Königsegg-Aulendorf (1817-1898). They had one son:

- Count Franz Xaver zu Königsegg-Aulendorf (1858-1927); married Countess Hedwig von Neipperg (1859-1916) and had issue.
