= Sophie Löwe =

German opera soprano

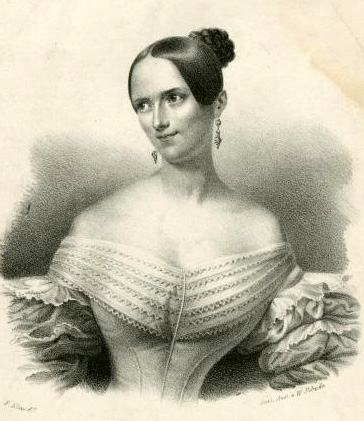
Sophie Löwe (1812–1866)

Johanna Sophie Christiane Löwe (24 March 1815 – 29 November 1866) was a German opera soprano, active mainly in Vienna and Berlin, and a Princess of Liechtenstein by marriage. She was one of the most famous German opera singers of her time.

== Life and career ==
Sophie Löwe was born on 24 March 1815 in Oldenburg, daughter of the actor Ferdinand Löwe (1787–1832). From 1831, she studied in Vienna under Giuseppe Ciccimarra. 1832 she debuted at the Kärntnertortheater. After a tour through northern Germany she got an engagement at the Berlin Court Opera in 1837.

Her most prominent performances were as the title character in Gaetano Donizetti's Maria Padilla (Milan, 1841), as Elvira in Giuseppe Verdi's Ernani (Venice, 1844), and as Odabella in Verdi's Attila (Venice, 1846). She clashed with Verdi over Ernani, to the point where he left Venice without paying her a customary visit. However, her skills were such that, nonetheless, Verdi wrote a major role for her in Attila two years later and highly praised her performance in it.

She retired from the opera in 1848, when she married Prince Friedrich Adalbert of Liechtenstein, the fourth son of Johann I Joseph, Prince of Liechtenstein. She died on 29 November 1866 in Pest.
