= Sophie Esterházy =

Austrian lady in waiting

Sophie of Liechtenstein
- Countess Esterházy von Galántha
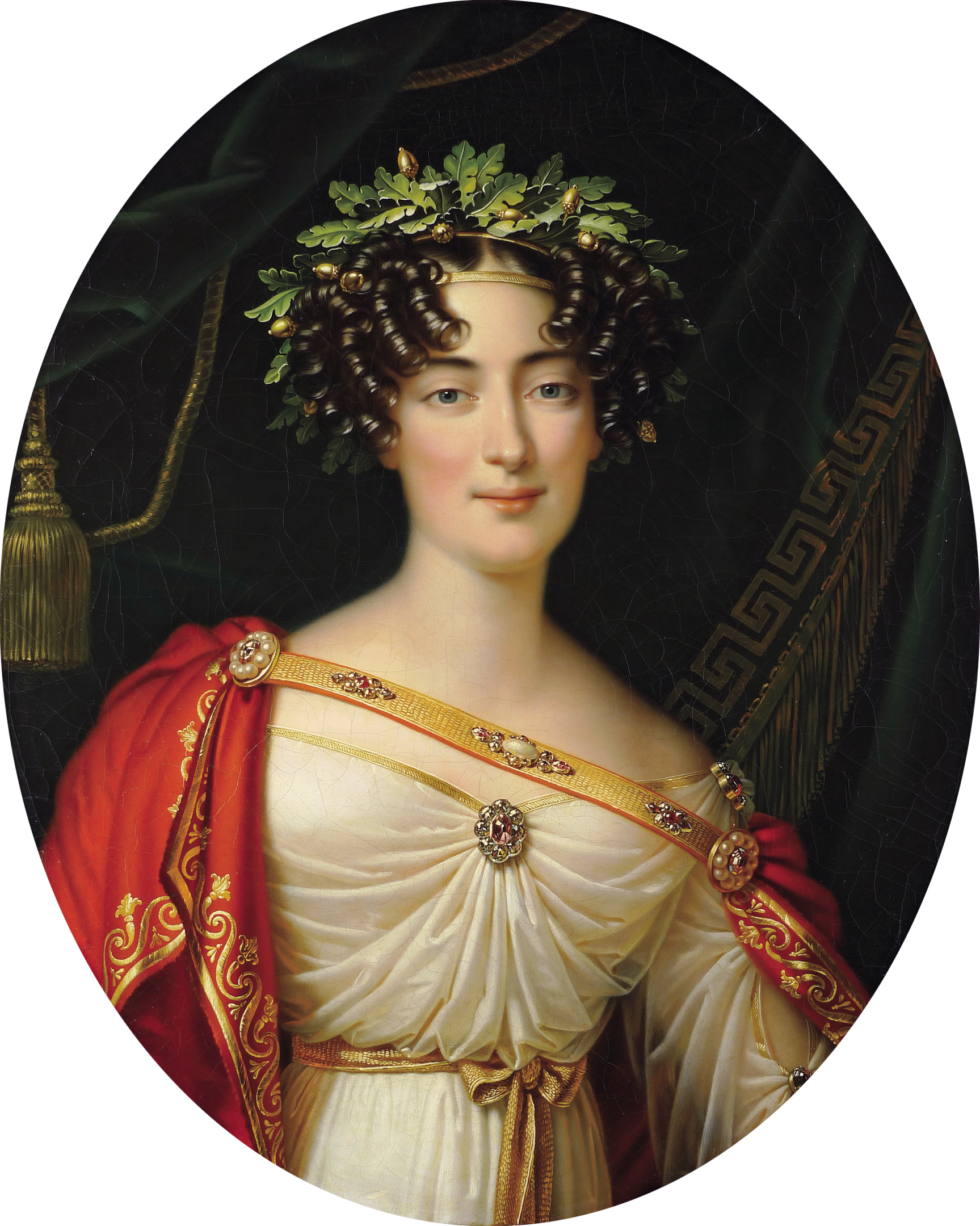
- Portrait by Joseph Karl Stieler, c. 1830
- Born: 5 September 1798; Vienna, Austria
- Died: 27 June 1869 (aged 70); Vienna, Austria
- Spouse: Count Vincenz Esterházy von Galántha (m. 1817; died 1835)
Names
- Sophie Marie Josepha
- House: Liechtenstein
- Father: Johann I Joseph, Prince of Liechtenstein
- Mother: Landgravine Josefa of Fürstenberg-Weitra

Princess Sophie Marie Josepha of Liechtenstein, Countess Esterházy von Galántha (5 September 1798 – 27 June 1869), was an Austrian noblewoman and Imperial court official. As the daughter of Johann I Joseph, Prince of Liechtenstein, she was a princess of Liechtenstein by birth. Born and raised in Vienna, she was selected to serve in the Austrian imperial court as Oberhofmeisterin (mistress of the Robes) to Empress Elisabeth of Austria from 1854 to 1862.

== Early life ==
Princess Sophie Marie Josepha von und zu Liechtenstein was born as third daughter of Johann I Joseph, Prince of Liechtenstein and his wife, Landgravine Josefa of Fürstenberg-Weitra.

== Court life ==
She was disliked by the Empress, as she was a friend and a confidante of the Empress' mother-in-law, Princess Sophie of Bavaria, and suspected to be her spy. She was also described as very strict, and her attitude toward Elisabeth was compared to a governess. Sophie was replaced by Countess Pauline Marie von Königsegg-Aulendorf. She has been portrayed in numerous books about Elisabeth.

== Personal life ==
She married in Vienna, on 4 August 1817, Count Vincenz Esterházy von Galántha (Pressburg, 25 October 1787 – Eisgrub, 19 October 1835), without issue.
