= Karoline, Princess of Liechtenstein =

Princess of Liechtenstein from 1783 to 1805

- Duchess of Troppau and Jägerndorf
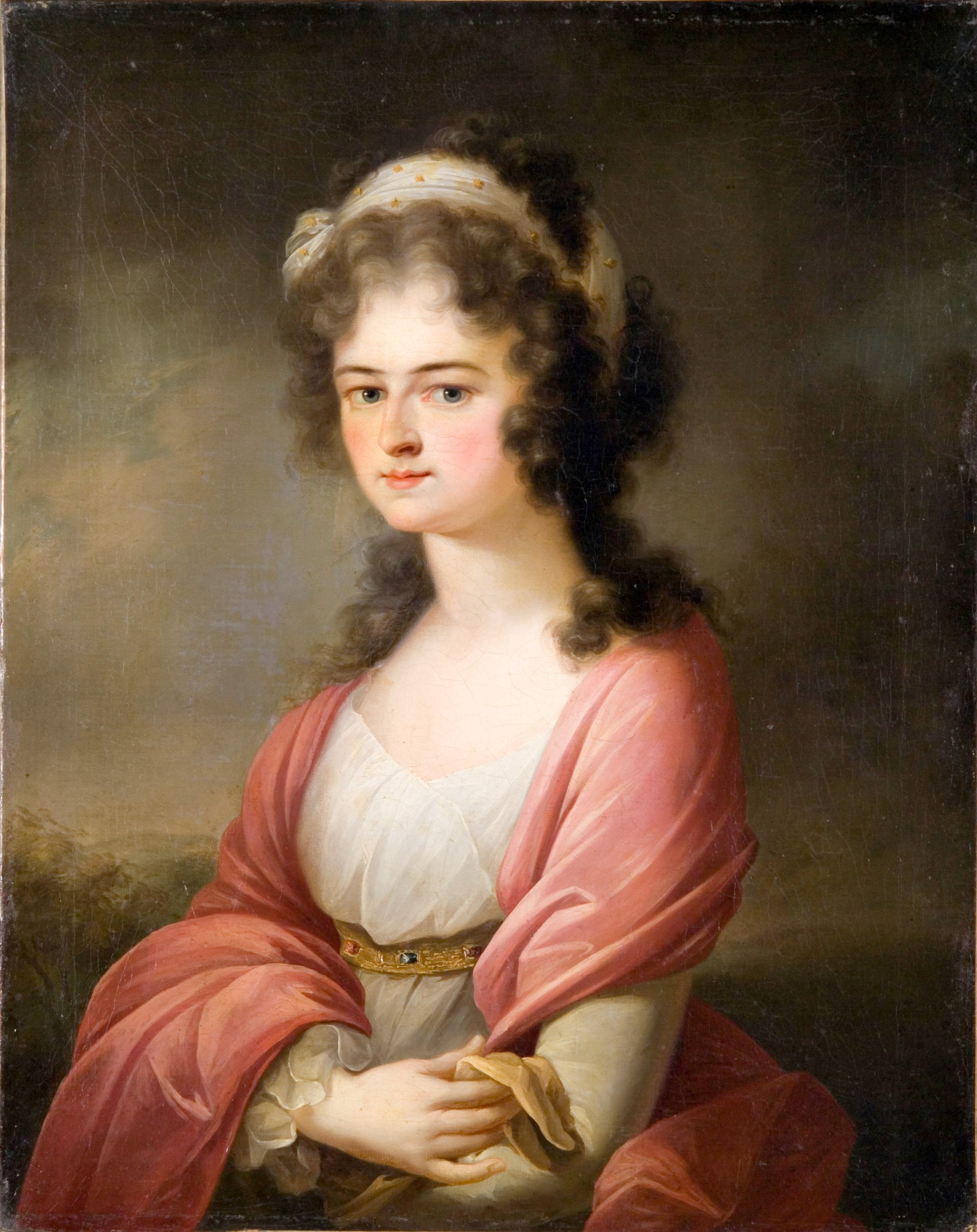

Princess consort of Liechtenstein
- Tenure: 16 November 1783 – 24 March 1805
- Born: 13 November 1768; Vienna, Austria
- Died: 1 March 1831 (aged 62); Vienna, Austrian Empire
- Burial: Church of the Nativity of the Virgin Mary, Brno
- Spouse: Aloys I, Prince of Liechtenstein (m. 1783; died 1805)
Names
- Karoline Felicitas Engelberte
- House: House of Manderscheid-Blankenheim
- Father: Count Johann Wilhelm of Manderscheid-Blankenheim
- Mother: Countess Johanna Maximiliana Franziska of Limburg-Stirum

Karoline Felicitas Engelberte of Manderscheid-Blankenheim (German: Karoline von Manderscheid-Blankenheim; 13 November 1768 – 1 March 1831) was a princess consort of Liechtenstein; married on 16 November 1783 to Prince Aloys I of Liechtenstein.

== Biography ==
Karoline was born on 13 November 1768 in Vienna. She was the daughter of Count Johann Wilhelm of Manderscheid-Blankenheim zu Geroldseck and Countess Johanna Maximiliana Franziska of Limburg-Stirum (daughter of Count Christian Otto of Limburg-Stirum). She had no children with her spouse, but two children with her long term lover Franz von Langendonck, captain of the Austrian army; one was her son Karl Ludwig, Viscount von Fribert, born in 1793. In 1805, her husband died and was succeeded by her brother-in-law as monarch. Karoline spent her remaining life mainly in Vienna. She died on 1 March 1831 in Vienna.

== Ancestry ==
Ancestors of Karoline, Princess of Liechtenstein

8. Count Salentin Ernst of Manderscheid-Blankenheim
4. Count Franz Georg of Manderscheid-Blankenheim
9. Countess Juliane Christine of Erbach
2. Count Johann Wilhelm of Manderscheid-Blankenheim
10. Count Leopold Wilhelm of Königsegg-Rothenfels
5. Countess Maria Johanna of Königsegg-Rothenfels
11. Countess Maria Polyxena of Scharffenberg
1. Countess Caroline of Manderscheid-Blankenheim
12. Count Moritz Hermann of Limburg-Stirum
6. Count Christian Otto of Limburg-Stirum
13. Countess Elisabeth Dorothea of Leiningen-Dagsburg
3. Countess Johanna Maximiliana of Limburg-Stirum
14. Prince Philipp Ernst of Hohenlohe-Waldenburg-Schillingsfürst
7. Princess Caroline Sophie of Hohenlohe-Waldenburg-Schillingsfürst
15. Countess Franziska Barbara of Welz

Karoline, Princess of Liechtenstein House of Manderscheid-Blankenheim Born: 13 November 1768 Died: 1 March 1831
Liechtensteiner royalty
Preceded by Leopoldine von Sternberg	Princess consort of Liechtenstein; 1783–1805	Succeeded by Josepha of Fürstenberg-Weitra
