= Prince Emanuel of Liechtenstein (1700–1771) =

Emanuel Joseph Johann
- Prince of Liechtenstein
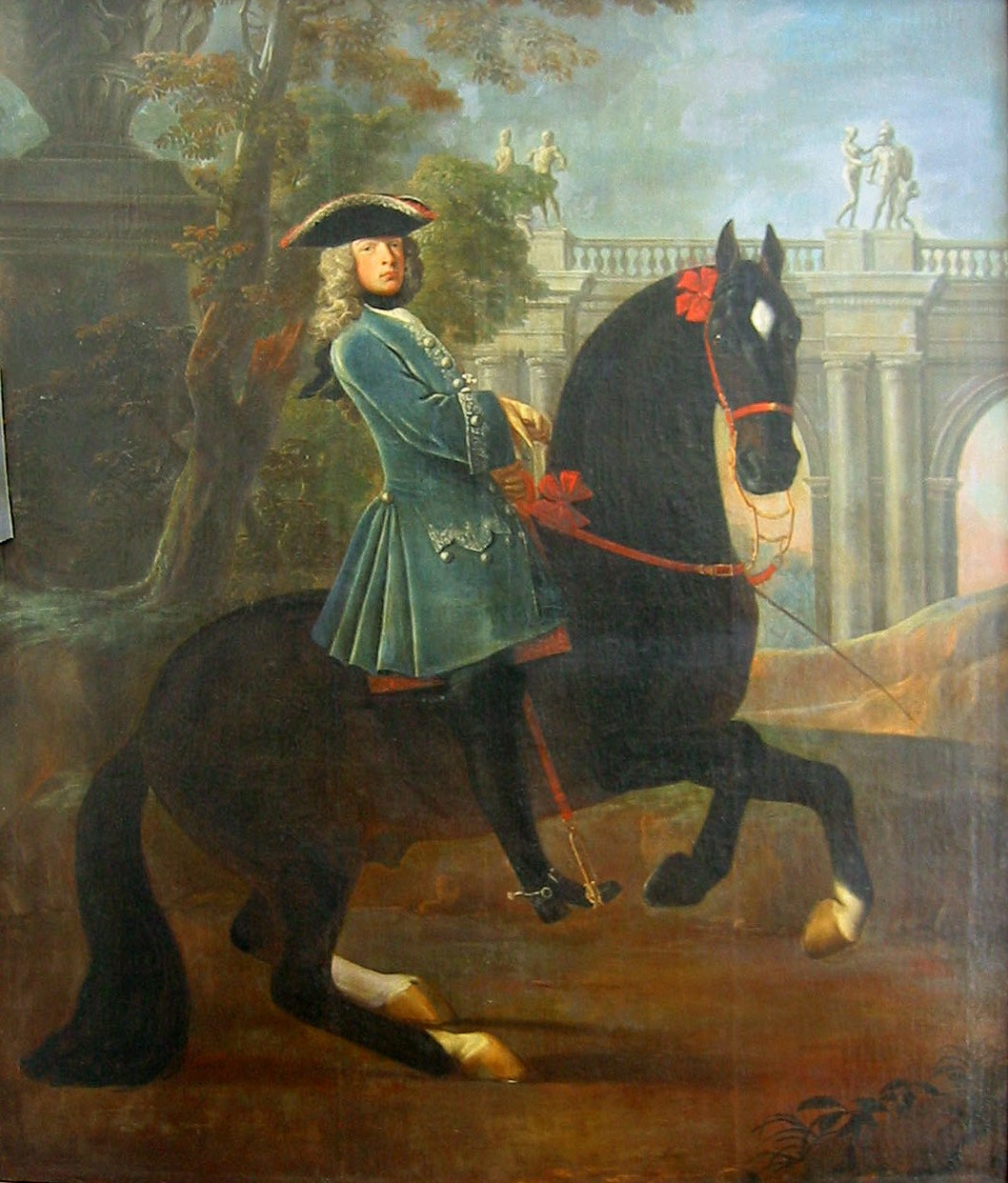
- Born: 2 or 3 February 1700; Vienna, Austria
- Died: 15 January 1771 (aged 70); Vienna, Austria
- Spouse: Countess Maria Anna Antonia of Dietrichstein-Weichselstädt, Baroness of Hollenburg and Finkenstein (m. 1726; died 1777)
- Issue: 13; including Franz Joseph I, Prince of Liechtenstein; Prince Karl Borromäus
Names
- Emanuel Joseph Johann
- House: Liechtenstein
- Father: Prince Philipp Erasmus of Liechtenstein
- Mother: Countess Christina Theresa of Löwenstein-Wertheim-Rochefort

Prince Emanuel Joseph Johann of Liechtenstein (2 or 3 February 1700 – 15 January 1771) was the father and brother of two of Liechtenstein's monarchs.

== Early life ==
Prince Emanuel was born in Vienna on 2 or 3 February 1700. the second son of Prince Philipp Erasmus of Liechtenstein (1664–1704) and Countess Christina Theresa von Löwenstein-Wertheim-Rochefort (1665–1730). His elder brother was Josef Wenzel, Prince of Liechtenstein.

== Career ==
In 1749 he became the 734th Knight of the Order of the Golden Fleece.

== Personal life ==
On 14 January 1726, he married Countess Maria Anna Antonia von Dietrichstein-Weichselstädt (1706–1777) in Vienna. They had thirteen children. Their eldest son became monarch of Liechtenstein when Emanuel's brother died without any surviving heirs.

- Franz Joseph I, Prince of Liechtenstein (1726–1781), who married Countess Maria Leopoldine of Sternberg and had issue.
- Prince Karl Borromäus of Liechtenstein (1730–1789), who married Princess Maria Eleonore of Oettingen-Spielberg and had issue.
- Prince Philipp Joseph Franz Maria (1731–1757), who was killed in action in Prague; he died unmarried and without issue.
- Prince Emanuel Joseph Bartholomäus Antonius (1732–1738), who died young.
- Prince Johann Joseph Simplicius (1734–1781), who died unmarried and without issue
- Prince Anton Joseph Johannes Achatius (1735–1737), who died young.
- Prince Joseph Wenzel Ladislaus (1736–1739), who died young.
- Princess Maria Amalia Susanna (1737–1787), who married, as his first wife, Johann, 2nd Prince of Khevenhüller-Metsch in Vienna in 1754; she died in Milan.
- Princess Maria Anna Theresia (1738–1814), who married Count Emanuel Philibert von Waldstein-Wartenberg in Mährisch-Kromau in 1754, and had issue.
- Princess Franziska Xaveria Maria (1739–1821), who married Charles-Joseph, 7th Prince of Ligne in Feldsberg in 1755, and had issue.
- Princess Maria Christina Anna (1741–1819), who married Count Franz Ferdinand Kinsky von Wchinitz und Tettau in Vienna in 1761, and had issue.
- Princess Maria Theresia Anna (1741–1766), who married Count Károly József Jeromos Pálffy de Erdöd, Chancellor of Hungary, in Vienna in 1763, and had issue
- Prince Josef Leopold Sebastian Emanuel (1743–1771), who died unmarried and without issue in Gaya, India.

Prince Emanuel died on 15 January 1771 in Vienna. His widow died in Vienna on 7 January 1777.

== Ancestry ==
Ancestors of Prince Emanuel of Liechtenstein (1700–1771)

16. Hartmann II of Liechtenstein, Lord of Valtice, Lednice and Steyregg
8. Gundakar, Prince of Liechtenstein
17. Countess Anna Maria of Ortenburg
4. Prince Hartmann III of Liechtenstein
18. Enno III of East Frisia
9. Countess Agnes of East Frisia
19. Walburgis, Countess of Rietberg
2. Prince Philipp Erasmus of Liechtenstein
20. Count Werner of Salm-Reifferscheidt-Dyck
10. Count Ernst Friedrich of Salm-Reifferscheidt
21. Countess Maria of Limburg-Stirum
5. Countess Sidonie Elisabeth Salm-Reifferscheidt
22. Emich IX, Count of Leiningen-Dagsburg-Falkenburg
11. Countess Maria Ursula of Leiningen-Dagsburg-Falkenburg
23. Baroness Ursula of Fleckenstein
1. Prince Emanuel of Liechtenstein
24. Louis III, Count of Löwenstein
12. Johann Dietrich, Count of Löwenstein-Wertheim-Rochefort
25. Countess Anna of Stolberg-Königstein
6. Ferdinand Charles, Count of Löwenstein-Wertheim-Rochefort
26. Count Philipp von der Marck
13. Countess Josephine von der Marck
27. Countess Katharine of Manderscheid-Virneburg
3. Princess Christina of Löwenstein-Wertheim-Rochefort
28. Count Frederick IV of Fürstenberg-Heiligenberg
14. Count and Landgrave Egon VIII of Fürstenberg-Heiligenberg
29. Countess Elisabeth of Sulz
7. Countess Anna Maria of Fürstenberg
30. John George, Prince of Hohenzollern-Hechingen
15. Princess Anna Maria of Hohenzollern-Hechingen
31. Countess Franziska of Salm-Neufville
