= Aloys I of Liechtenstein =

Prince of Liechtenstein from 1781 to 1805

Aloys I
- Duke of Troppau and Jägerndorf
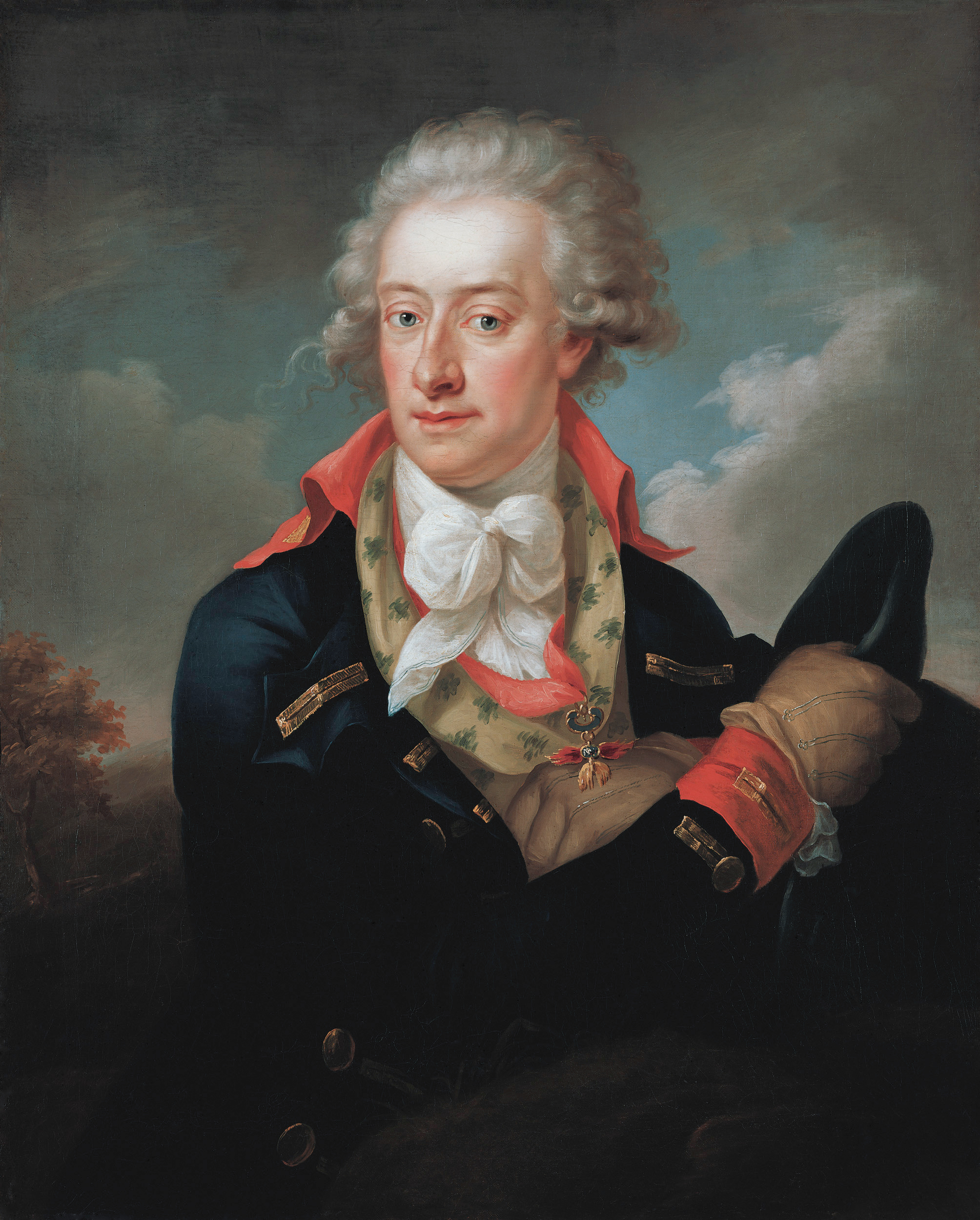
- Portrait by Stroehling, 1794

Prince of Liechtenstein
- Reign: 18 August 1781 – 24 March 1805
- Predecessor: Franz Joseph I
- Successor: Johann I Joseph
- Born: 14 May 1759; Vienna, Archduchy of Austria
- Died: 24 March 1805 (aged 45); Vienna, Austrian Empire
- Burial: Church of the Nativity of the Virgin Mary, Brno
- Spouse: Karoline von Manderscheid-Blankenheim (m. 1783)
Names
- Aloys Josef Johannes Nepomuk Melchior
- House: Liechtenstein
- Father: Franz Joseph I, Prince of Liechtenstein
- Mother: Leopoldine von Sternberg
- Religion: Roman Catholic

Aloys I (Aloys Josef Johannes Nepomuk Melchior; 14 May 1759 – 24 March 1805) was the Prince of Liechtenstein from 18 August 1781 until his death in 1805. He was born in Vienna, the third son of Franz Josef I, Prince of Liechtenstein.

Aloys was enlisted in the military as a youth but withdrew due to poor health. His great interest was forestry and gardening and had many trees from overseas planted around his manors for both economic and aesthetic reasons. He also decorated Eisgrub Park with ornamental buildings. Aloys I supported mining operations within his lands in Moravia in order to raise money. This included the construction of an ironworks at Olomouc.

Aloys I also expanded the Liechtenstein library through the purchase of complete collections of books. Aloys I had the architect Joseph Hardtmuth design a new palace in Herrengasse, Vienna. He hired a seasonal theater group and a permanent music group.

During his reign, Liechtenstein carried out the last execution in its history when Barbara Erni was beheaded in Eschen for theft.

He was the 836th Knight of the Order of the Golden Fleece in Austria.

Aloys married Karoline Gräfin von Manderscheid-Blankenheim (14 November 1768, in Köln – 11 June 1831, in Vienna) in Feldsberg on 15 November/16 November 1783. The couple were childless. Following Aloys' death in Vienna, Liechtenstein went to his brother Johann I.

Aloys I of Liechtenstein House of Liechtenstein Born: 14 May 1759 Died: 24 March 1805
Regnal titles
Preceded by Franz Joseph I	Prince of Liechtenstein; 1781–1805	Succeeded by Johann I Joseph
