= Leopoldine, Princess of Liechtenstein =

Princess of Liechtenstein from 1772 to 1781

Princess Leopoldine
- Duchess of Troppau and Jägerndorf
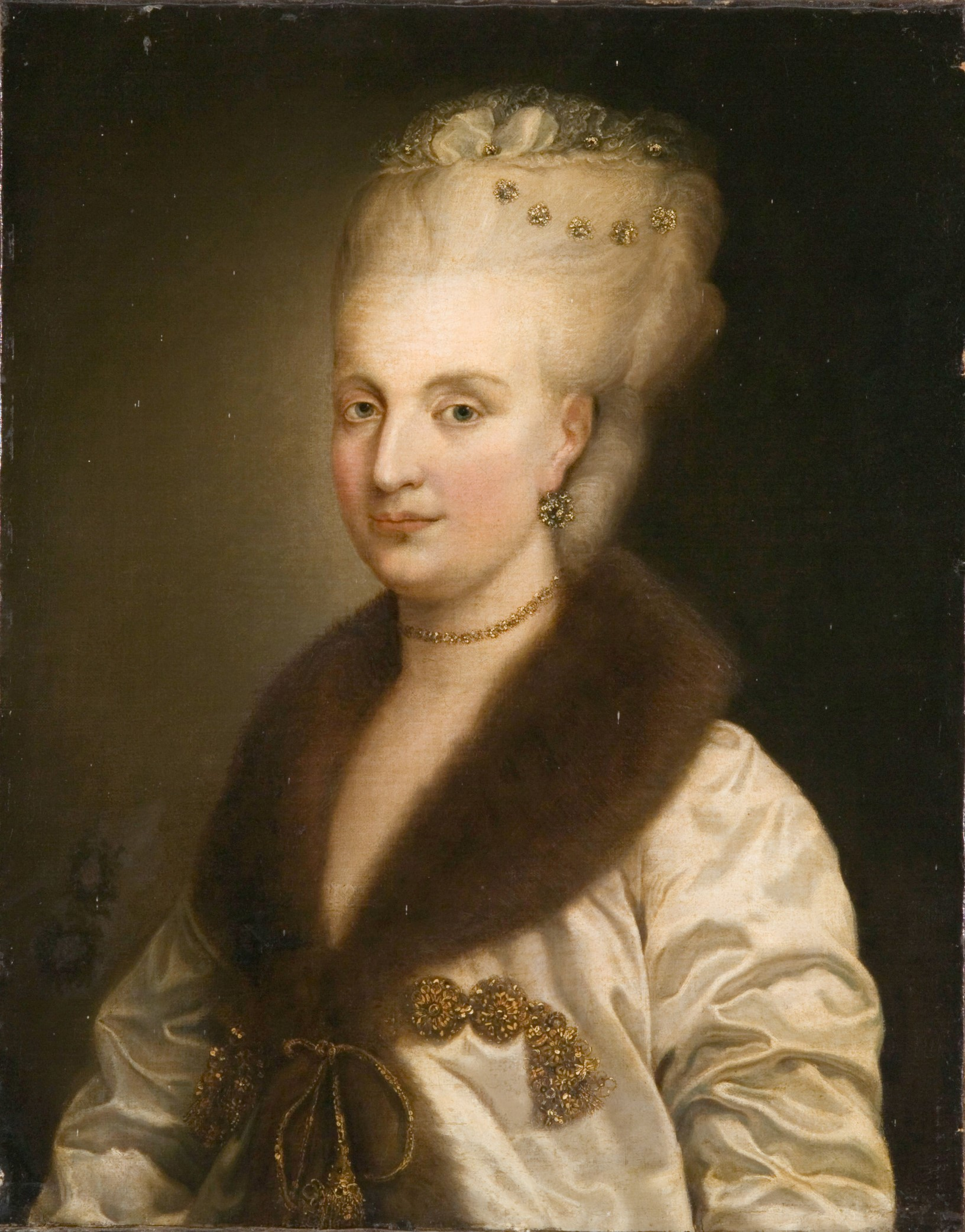

Princess consort of Liechtenstein
- Tenure: 10 February 1772 – 18 August 1781
- Born: 11 December 1733; Vienna, Austria
- Died: 1 March 1809 (aged 75); Valtice, Austrian Empire
- Burial: Church of the Nativity of the Virgin Mary, Brno
- Spouse: Franz Joseph I of Liechtenstein (m. 1750; died 1781)
- Issue: Aloys I, Prince of Liechtenstein; Johann I Joseph, Prince of Liechtenstein; Maria Josepha Hermengilde Esterházy
Names
- Maria Leopoldine Walburga Eva
- House: Sternberg
- Father: Count Franz Philipp of Sternberg
- Mother: Countess Leopoldine of Starhemberg

Leopoldine von Sternberg (Maria Leopoldine Walburga Eva; 11 December 1733, Vienna – 1 March 1809, Valtice) was a princess consort of Liechtenstein by marriage to Prince Franz Joseph I. She is noted to have belonged to the discussion circle of Eleonore of Liechtenstein, who acted as political advisers to Emperor Joseph II.

== Life ==
Leopoldine was born as the second child and the eldest daughter of Count Franz Philipp of Sternberg and his wife, Countess Leopoldine of Starhemberg, elder sister of Georg Adam, Prince of Starhemberg.

Countess Marie Leopoldine married Franz Joseph I, Prince of Liechtenstein, on 6 July 1750 in Valtice or Feldsberg.

After the death of her spouse in 1781, she lived permanently in Vienna with her youngest daughter, Princess Maria Josepha Hermenegilde Esterhazy.

She belonged to the salon or discussion circle of five princesses, headed by Eleonore of Liechtenstein, who acted as the political advisers of Emperor Joseph II, and who met him once a week (four times a week after 1780) to discuss state affairs.

This circle consisted of Princess Eleonore of Liechtenstein, Princess Maria Josepha von Clary und Aldringen, Princess Maria Sidonia Kinsky von Wchinitz und Tettau, Princess Leopoldine von Liechtenstein, Count Franz Moritz von Lacy, and Prince Franz Xaver Wolfgang von Orsini-Rosenberg, the Master of the Imperial treasury.

== Issue ==
The couple had eight children:

- Joseph Franz de Paula Emanuel Philipp Isaias (Vienna, 6 July 1752 – Vienna, 17 February 1754)
- Leopoldina Maria Anna Francisca de Paula Adelgunda (Vienna, 30 January 1754 – Frankfurt, 16 October 1823), married in Felsberg on 1 September 1771 Karl Emanuel, Landgrave of Hesse-Rheinfels-Rotenburg, and had issue (including Victor Amadeus, Landgrave of Hesse-Rotenburg)
- Maria Antonia Aloysia Walburga Mechthildis (Vienna, 14 March 1756 – Vienna, 1 December 1821), a nun
- Franz de Paula Joseph (Vienna, 19 May 1758 – Vienna, 15 August 1760)
- Aloys I, Prince of Liechtenstein (1759–1805)
- Johann I Joseph, Prince of Liechtenstein (1760–1836)
- Philipp Joseph Aloys Martinianus (Vienna, 2 July 1762 – Vienna, 18 May 1802), unmarried and without issue
- Maria Josepha Hermenegilde (Vienna, 13 April 1768 – Hütteldorf, 8 August 1845), married in Vienna on 15 September 1783 Nikolaus, 7th Prince Esterházy von Galántha (Vienna, 12 December 1765 – Como, 24 November 1833), and had issue.

== Ancestry ==
Ancestors of Leopoldine, Princess of Liechtenstein

16. Count Jan Rudolf of Sternberg
8. Count Oldřich Adolf of Sternberg
17. Baroness Helena Eustachie Křinecká of Ronova
4. Count Franz Damian of Sternberg
18. Count Jachym Oldřich of Chlum and Košumberk
9. Countess Anna Lucie of Chlum and Košumberk
19. Countess Franziska of Meggau-Worporzan
2. Count Franz Philipp of Sternberg
20. Count Johann Maximilian of Trauttmansdorff-Gleichenberg
10. Count Johann Friedrich of Trauttmansdorff
21. Countess Mária Zsofia Pálffy of Erdöd
5. Countess Maria Josepha of Trauttmansdorff
22. Count Vaclav Jiří Holický of Sternberg
11. Countess Marie Eleonora Holická of Sternberg
23. Countess Vorsila Polyxena Borita of Martinic
1. Countess Maria Leopoldine of Sternberg
24. Count Conrad Balthasar of Starhemberg
12. Count Franz Ottokar of Starhemberg
25. Countess Caterina Francesca Cavriani
6. Count Conrad Sigismund of Starhemberg
26. Count Johann Otto of Rindsmaul
13. Countess Cecilia Clara of Rindsmaul
27. Countess Marie Eleonore of Dietrichstein
3. Countess Maria Leopoldine of Starhemberg
28. Ferdinand Karl, Count of Löwenstein-Wertheim-Rochefort
14. Maximilian Karl, Prince of Löwenstein-Wertheim-Rochefort
29. Countess Anna Maria of Fürstenberg-Heiligenberg
7. Princess Maria Leopoldine of Löwenstein-Wertheim-Rochefort
30. Mathias Khuen von Belasi, Lichtenberg and Gandegg
15. Countess Polyxena Khuen von Belasi of Lichtenberg and Gandegg
31. Countess Anna Susanna of Meggau-Kreutzen

Leopoldine, Princess of Liechtenstein House of Sternberg Born: 11 December 1733 Died: 1 March 1809
Liechtensteiner royalty
Preceded by Anna Maria of Liechtenstein	Princess consort of Liechtenstein; 1772–1781	Succeeded by Karoline von Manderscheid-Blankenheim
