= Franz Joseph I of Liechtenstein =

Prince of Liechtenstein from 1772 to 1781

Franz Joseph I
- Duke of Troppau and Jägerndorf
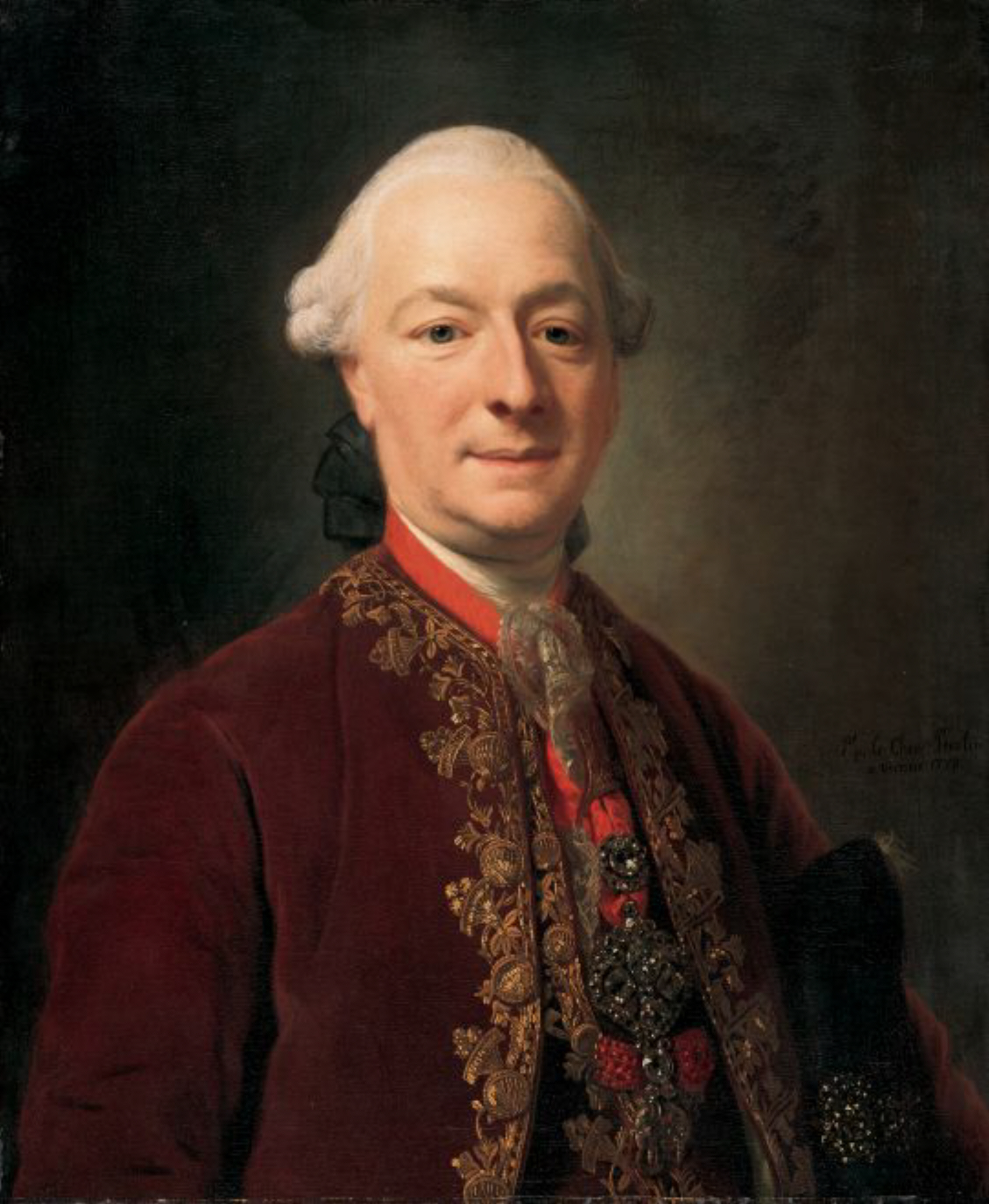
- Portrait by Alexander Roslin c. 1778

Prince of Liechtenstein
- Reign: 10 February 1772 – 18 August 1781
- Predecessor: Josef Wenzel I
- Successor: Aloys I
- Born: 19 November 1726; Milan, Duchy of Milan
- Died: 18 August 1781 (aged 54); Metz, Kingdom of France
- Burial: Church of the Nativity of the Virgin Mary, Brno
- Spouse: Leopoldine von Sternberg (m. 1750)
- Issue: Joseph Franz de Paula; Leopoldina Maria Anna; Maria Antonia Aloysia; Franz de Paula Joseph; Aloys I, Prince of Liechtenstein; Johann I Joseph, Prince of Liechtenstein; Philipp Joseph Aloys; Maria Josepha Hermengilde Esterházy
Names
- Franz de Paula Josef Johann Nepomuk Andreas
- House: Liechtenstein
- Father: Prince Emanuel of Liechtenstein
- Mother: Countess Anna Antonia of Dietrichstein-Weichselstädt
- Religion: Roman Catholic

Franz Joseph I, Prince of Liechtenstein (born Franz de Paula Josef Johann Nepomuk Andreas; 19 November 1726 – 18 August 1781), was Prince of Liechtenstein from 1772 until his death in 1781.

== Biography ==
Born in Milan, in what is now northern Italy, he was the son of Prince Emanuel of Liechtenstein and Maria Anna Antonia, Countess of Dietrichstein-Weichselstädt, Baroness zu Hollenburg und Finkenstein (10 September 1706 – 7 June 1777). Franz Josef was the eldest of their thirteen children. He was a nephew of Joseph Wenzel I, whom he succeeded on 10 February 1772.

Franz Joseph had been recognised heir to Liechtenstein since 1723, when his uncle's only son had died. Joseph Wenzel took Franz Joseph under his wing and Franz Joseph accompanied him in a campaign in Northern Italy, fighting with Wenzel at the Battle of Piacenza. The battle was a victory for the Holy Roman Empire, of which Liechtenstein was a part.

He was the 802nd Knight of the Order of the Golden Fleece in Austria.

In 1763, Franz Josef traveled on behalf of the Emperor to Spain, to bring the bride of Archduke Leopold a picture of the Archduke. In 1767, he became Privy Councillor, and in 1771, he received the Order of the Golden Fleece.

His last public role was to act as president of the Lower Austrian Nobility in 1778.

Once Franz Joseph became Prince of Liechtenstein, he showed great interest in its economic problems and the ever-increasing Liechtenstein art collection. He died in Metz in 1781.

== Marriage and issue ==
Franz Josef married Marie Leopoldine Gräfin von Sternberg (Vienna, 11 December 1733 – Feldsberg, 27 June 1809), a member of the Bohemian nobility, on 6 July 1750 in Valtice or Feldsberg. The couple had 8 children:

- Joseph Franz de Paula Emanuel Philipp Isaias (Vienna, 6 July 1752 – Vienna, 17 February 1754)
- Leopoldina Maria Anna Francisca de Paula Adelgunda (Vienna, 30 January 1754 – Frankfurt, 16 October 1823), married in Felsberg on 1 September 1771 Karl Emanuel, Landgrave of Hesse-Rheinfels-Rotenburg, and had issue
- Maria Antonia Aloysia Walburga Mechthildis (Vienna, 14 March 1756 – Vienna, 1 December 1821), a Nun
- Franz de Paula Joseph (Vienna, 19 May 1758 – Vienna, 15 August 1760)
- Aloys I, Prince of Liechtenstein (1759–1805)
- Johann I Joseph, Prince of Liechtenstein (1760–1836)
- Philipp Joseph Aloys Martinianus (Vienna, 2 July 1762 – Vienna, 18 May 1802), unmarried and without issue
- Maria Josepha Hermenegilde (Vienna, 13 April 1768 – Hütteldorf, 8 August 1845), married in Vienna on 15 September 1783 Nikolaus, 7th Fürst Esterházy von Galántha (Vienna, 12 December 1765 – Como, 24 November 1833), and had issue

Franz Joseph I of Liechtenstein House of Liechtenstein Born: 1726 Died: 1781
Regnal titles
Preceded by Josef Wenzel I	Prince of Liechtenstein; 1772–1781	Succeeded by Aloys I
