= Prince Alexander of Liechtenstein (1929–2012) =

Prince of the House of Liechtenstein and a businessman

- Born: 14 May 1929; Vienna, Austria
- Died: 16 March 2012 (aged 82); Rosegg, Kärnten
- Burial: Rosegg's municipal cemetery
- Spouse: Princess Josephine of Löwenstein-Wertheim-Rosenberg (m. 1961)
- Issue: Prince Christian; Prince Stefan; Prince Emanuel
Names
- Alexander Friedrich Manfred Maria von und zu Liechtenstein
- House: Liechtenstein
- Father: Prince Alfred of Liechtenstein
- Mother: Countess Polixena of Collalto and San Salvatore

Prince Alexander of Liechtenstein (full name: Alexander Friedrich Manfred Maria von und zu Liechtenstein; 14 May 1929 – 16 March 2012) was a Prince of the House of Liechtenstein and a businessman in the forestry and timber industries. His son, Prince Stefan of Liechtenstein, was Liechtenstein's ambassador to Germany, ambassador to Switzerland, and current ambassador to the Vatican.

== Life ==
He was the eldest son of Prince Alfred of Liechtenstein (1900–1972) – a descendant of Johann I Joseph, Prince of Liechtenstein – and Countess Polixena of Collalto and San Salvatore (1905–1984). In 1961 in Bronnbach he married Josephine, Princess of Löwenstein-Wertheim-Rosenberg (born 1937), a daughter of Karl II, 8th Prince of Löwenstein-Wertheim-Rosenberg. He settled with his family in his family home of Schloss Rosegg, conserving it and reopening it to the public. The couple had three sons, starting with twins in 1961, Christian and Stefan of Liechtenstein - Christopher became a doctor in Villach and Stefan became Liechtenstein's ambassador to Germany in 2007. Their third son Emanuel was born in 1964 and took over management of the Schloss and its attached zoo and waxwork display. Alexander was buried on 24 March 2012 in Rosegg's municipal cemetery.
