= Franz, 1st Prince of Orsini-Rosenberg =

Franz Xaver
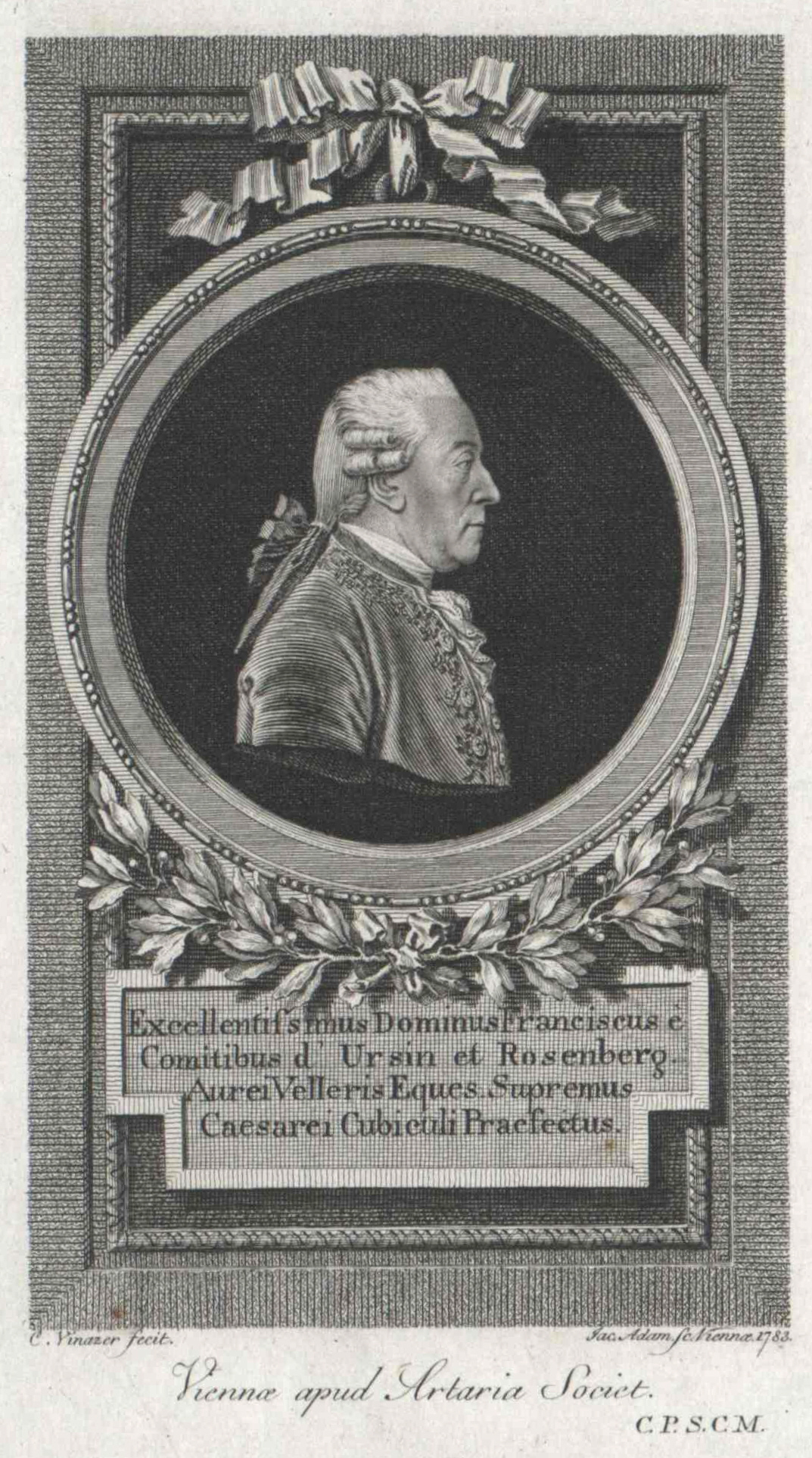
- Engraving of Orsini-Rosenberg by Jacob Adam, 1783

Prince of Orsini-Rosenberg
- Reign: 1791–1796
- Predecessor: None
- Successor: Franz Seraph
- Born: 6 April 1723; Vienna, Archduchy of Austria
- Died: 14 November 1796 (aged 73); Vienna, Archduchy of Austria
Names
- Franz Xaver Wolfgang von Orsini-Rosenberg
- House: Orsini-Rosenberg
- Father: Count Wolfgang Sigismund von Orsini-Rosenberg
- Mother: Countess Maria Anna von Hohenfeld

Franz Xaver Wolfgang von Rosenberg, Fürst von Orsini-Rosenberg (6 April 1723 – 14 November 1796), was an Austrian nobleman, diplomat and politician. He initially worked in several countries as a diplomat for the Archduchy of Austria, subsequently as an advisor and Chief Steward at the Court of the Grand Duke of Tuscany, and later in the same capacity at the Imperial Court in Vienna. In 1790, he was elevated to the rank of Imperial Prince by Emperor Leopold II.

== Early life ==
Orsini-Rosenberg was born in Vienna on 6 April 1723. He was the eldest son of Count Wolfgang Sigismund von Orsini-Rosenberg (1682–1739) and Countess Maria Anna Margareta Eleonora von Hohenfeld (b. 1693).

His paternal grandparents were Count Joseph Paris von Orsini-Rosenberg and Countess Maria Isabella Cäcilia von Lamberg. His maternal grandparents were Count Otto Heinrich von Hohenfeld and Countess Maria Katharina von Starhemberg.

== Career ==
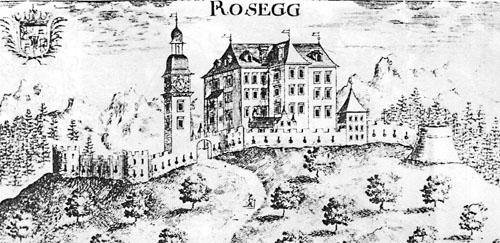
Rosegg Castle, 1688

After studying law in Vienna, he initially worked as an Austrian diplomat in London, then in Milan from 1748 to 1750, Copenhagen from 1750 to 1757, and in Madrid from 1757 to 1765. There, at the Spanish court, he led the negotiations for the marriage of the Austrian Archduke Leopold to the Infanta Maria Luisa of Spain. Orsini-Rosenberg accompanied the bride to the wedding on 5 August 1765 in Innsbruck. On 18 August, Emperor Francis I, Leopold's father, died. Since the latter had nominally held the position of Grand Duke of Tuscany since 1761, he took over the government of the Grand Duchy.

At Leopold's express wish, Maria Theresa sent Orsini-Rosenberg to the Florentine court as an advisor, with the instruction that he keep her regularly informed about developments in Tuscany. After the death of the first Tuscan minister, Franz von Thurn-Valsassina, on 9 February 1766, Orsini-Rosenberg assumed his position as Obersthofmeister and Head of the Grand Ducal State, War, and Finance Chancelleries. As such, he implemented a fundamental reform of the then desolate Tuscan administration, so that within a few years the country became one of the best-organized reform states of enlightened absolutism. He enjoyed the trust of both Maria Theresa, who was as domineering as she was suspicious of her children, and that of her son, Leopold, who strove for independence.

In 1772, at his own request, he gave up his offices in Tuscany and returned to Vienna. From September 1772 he had Rosegg Castle built in the Rosegg estate in southern Carinthia, which he had inherited from his father who had died in 1739. The Castle was completed in 1775. On behalf of Maria Theresa he accompanied Archduke Maximilian Francis of Austria, the later Archbishop-Elector of Cologne, on his Grand Tour of Europe in 1774 and 1775. In 1777 Orsini-Rosenberg was appointed Chief Chamberlain and Conference Minister at Emperor Joseph II's court. Although he enjoyed the emperor's trust, he was rarely able to exert a moderating influence on his hasty reforms. After the death of Joseph II in February 1790, Leopold was crowned Emperor as Leopold II. During the coronation ceremony, he elevated Franz Xaver von Orsini-Rosenberg to the rank of Imperial Prince, with the provision that this status should also be passed on to his cousin Vinzenz von Orsini-Rosenberg and his descendants. Under Leopold, as well as under his successor, Francis II, Orsini-Rosenberg held the offices of Minister of State and Conference and Chief Chamberlain.

== Personal life ==
Prince Orsini-Rosenberg, who never married, died in Vienna in 1796 and was buried in Rosegg.
