= List of ambassadors to Switzerland =

This is a list of ambassadors to Switzerland. Note that some ambassadors are responsible for more than one country while others are directly accredited to Bern.

| Sending country | Presentation of Credentials | Location of resident embassy | Ambassador |
|---|---|---|---|
| Afghanistan | 01.04.2019 | Geneva, Switzerland | Nasir Andisha |
| Albania | June 2023 | Bern, Switzerland | Mustafa Nano |
| Algeria | 30.03.2021 | Bern, Switzerland | Salah Lebdioui |
| Andorra | 10.01.2012 | Andorra la Vella, Andorra | Enric Tarrado Vives |
| Angola | 27.10.2011 | Bern, Switzerland | Osvaldo dos Santos Varela |
| Argentina | ? | Bern, Switzerland | Alberto Pedro D'Alotto |
| Armenia | 07.06.2019 | Geneva, Switzerland | Andranik Hovhannisyan |
| Australia | 24.11.2009 | Berlin, Germany | Peter Martin Tesch |
| Austria | 01.09.2016 | Bern, Switzerland | Ursula Plassnik |
| Azerbaijan | 10.10.2017 | Bern, Switzerland | Hanum Ibrahimova |
| Bahrain | 10.03.2009 | Paris, France | Nasser Mohamed Yusuf Albalooshi |
| Bangladesh | 11.01.2011 | Geneva, Switzerland | Abdul Hannan |
| Belarus | 2016 | Bern, Switzerland | Pavel Matsukevich (Chargé d’Affaires a.i.) |
| Belgium | 02.09.2014 | Bern, Switzerland | Frank Recker |
| Benin | 20.04.2010 | Geneva, Switzerland | Séraphin Lissassi |
| Bhutan | 04.06.2012 | Geneva, Switzerland | Choda Tenzin (Chargé d’Affaires a.i.) |
| Bolivia | 20.08.2011 | Berlin, Germany | Alfredo Benjamin Candia Torrico |
| Bosnia and Herzegovina | 01.03.2012 | Bern, Switzerland | Dragana Kremenovic-Kusmuk |
| Botswana | 27.03.2012 | Geneva, Switzerland | Mothusi Bruce Rabasha Palai |
| Brazil | 27.03.2012 | Bern, Switzerland | Igor Kipman |
| Brunei Darussalam | 29.06.2010 | Berlin, Germany | Dato Mohammad Yusof Abu Bakar |
| Bulgaria | 26.06.2012 | Bern, Switzerland | Meglena Ivanova Plugtschieva-Alexandrova |
| Burkina Faso | 11.11.2001 | Geneva, Switzerland | Prosper Vokouma |
| Burundi | 14.06.2023 | Geneva, Switzerland | Elise Nkerabirori |
| Cambodia | 01.07.2008 | Geneva, Switzerland | Sun Suon |
| Cameroon | 29.05.2008 | Bern, Switzerland | Léonard Henri Bindzi |
| Canada | | Bern, Switzerland | |
| Cape Verde | 11.01.2011 | Geneva, Switzerland | José Luis Barbosa Leao Monteiro |
| Central African Republic | 07.05.2009 | Geneva, Switzerland | Léopold Samba |
| Chad | 09.09.2005 | Geneva, Switzerland | Malloum Bamanga Abbas |
| China | 16.09.2010 | Bern, Switzerland | Wu Ken |
| Colombia | 12.01.2016 | Bern, Switzerland | Julian Jaramillo Escobar |
| Comoros | 29.04.2008 | Paris, France | Soulaïmana Mohamed |
| Congo | 24.11.2009 | Geneva, Switzerland | Luc-Joseph Okio |
| Costa Rica | 26.06.2012 | Bern, Switzerland | Isabel Violeta Montero de la Camara |
| Côte d'Ivoire | 27.10.2011 | Bern, Switzerland | Kouadio Adjoumani |
| Croatia | 25.10.2007 | Bern, Switzerland | Jaksa Muljacić |
| Cuba | 30.03.2021 | Bern, Switzerland | Adela Mayra Ruiz Garcia |
| Cyprus | 19.04.2007 | Brussels, Belgium | Athena Droushiotis-Mavronicola |
| Czech Republic | | Bern, Switzerland | |
| Democratic Republic of Congo | 26.11.2009 | Bern, Switzerland | Sébastien Mutomb Mujing |
| Denmark | | Switzerland | Susanne Christina Hyldeland |
| Djibouti | 30.11.2006 | Geneva, Switzerland | Mohamed Siad Doualeh |
| Dominica | 15.10.2009 | Bern, Switzerland | Teresita Migdalia Torres Garcia |
| Dominican Republic | 30.03.2021 | Bern, Switzerland | Jose Sanchez Fung |
| Ecuador | 02.09.2014 | Bern, Switzerland | Gonzalo Salvador Holguin |
| Egypt | 20.10.2016 | Bern, Switzerland | Hisham Seifeldin |
| El Salvador | 03.10.2007 | Geneva, Switzerland | Byron Fernando Larios Lopez |
| Equatorial Guinea | 03.10.2007 | Paris, France | Federico Edjo Ovono Eyang |
| Eritrea | 15.01.2004 | Geneva, Switzerland | Bereket Woldeyohannes (Chargé d’Affaires a.i.) |
| Estonia | 11.01.2011 | Tallinn, Estonia | Katrin Saarsalu-Layachi |
| Ethiopia | 23.06.2011 | Geneva, Switzerland | Minelik Alemu Getahun |
| European Union | September 2016 | Bern, Switzerland | Michael Matthiessen |
| Finland | 08.09.2009 | Bern, Switzerland | Alpo Matti Ilmari Rusi |
| France | 20.10.2016 | Bern, Switzerland | Anne Paugam |
| Gabon | 26.06.2012 | Paris, France | Germain Ngoyo Moussavou |
| Gambia | 18.02.2012 | Paris, France | Saikou Jaiteh (Chargé d’Affaires a.i.) |
| Georgia | 01.09.2020 | Bern, Switzerland | Revaz Lominadze |
| Germany | 08.09.2011 | Bern, Switzerland | Klaus-Peter Gottwald |
| Ghana | 04.12.2008 | Bern, Switzerland | Ellen Serwaa Nee-Whang |
| Greece | 15.10.2009 | Bern, Switzerland | John Mourikis |
| Grenada | | Brussels, Belgium | vacant |
| Guatemala | 28.06.2005 | Paris, France | Anaisabel Prera Flores |
| Guinea | 15.01.2008 | Geneva, Switzerland | Mohamed Camara |
| Guinea-Bissau | 08.12.2011 | Brussels, Belgium | Alfredo Lopes Cabral |
| Haiti | | Paris, France | vacant |
| Honduras | | Paris, France | vacant |
| Holy See | 08.09.2011 | Bern, Switzerland | Diego Causero |
| Hungary | 30.3.2021 | Bern, Switzerland | Jozsef Czukor |
| Iceland | 23.06.2011 | Brussels, Belgium | Thorir Ibsen |
| India | 20.10.2017 | Bern, Switzerland | Sibi George |
| Indonesia | 20.04.2010 | Bern, Switzerland | Djoko Susilo |
| Iraq | 29.06.2010 | Bern, Switzerland | Pirot Ahmed Ibrahim Ibrahim |
| Iran | 20.04.2010 | Bern, Switzerland | Alireza Salari Sharifabad |
| Ireland | 16.09.2010 | Bern, Switzerland | Martin Burke |
| Israel | 13.12.2011 | Bern, Switzerland | Shalom Cohen (Chargé d’Affaires a.i.) |
| Italy | 11.01.2007 | Bern, Switzerland | Giuseppe Deodato |
| Jamaica | 23.06.2011 | Geneva, Switzerland | Wayne St John McCook |
| Japan | 08.12.2011 | Bern, Switzerland | Kazuyoshi Umemoto |
| Jordan | 18.3.2014 | Bern, Switzerland | Amjad Jamil Al Qhaiwi |
| Kazakhstan | 23.11.2022 | Bern, Switzerland | Kairat Sarzhanov |
| Kenya | 09.09.2009 | London, UK | Addison Kutondo Chebukaka (Chargé d’Affaires a.i.) |
| Kyrgyzstan | 11.01.2011 | Geneva, Switzerland | Gulnara Iskakova |
| Kosovo | 15.10.2009 | Bern, Switzerland | Naim Malaj |
| Kuwait | 03.10.2007 | Bern, Switzerland | Suhail Khalil Yousef Shuhaiber |
| Laos | 07.05.2009 | Geneva, Switzerland | Yong Chanthalangsy |
| Latvia | 24.11.2009 | Vienna, Austria | Indulis Berzins |
| Lebanon | 01.07.2008 | Bern, Switzerland | Hussein Rammal |
| Lesotho | 11.04.2008 | Geneva, Switzerland | Anthony Mothae Maruping |
| Liberia | 28.06.2005 | Paris, France | Dudley McKinley Thomas |
| Libya | 29.09.2011 | Bern, Switzerland | Sliman Bouchuiguir |
| Liechtenstein | 26.03.2013 | Bern, Switzerland | Doris Frick |
| Lithuania | 26.06.2012 | Bern, Switzerland | Jonas Rudalevicius |
| Luxembourg | 03.10.2007 | Bern, Switzerland | Gérard Léon Pierre Philipps |
| Madagascar | 05.05.2012 | Geneva, Switzerland | Solofo Andrianjatovo Razafitrimo (Chargé d’Affaires a.i.) |
| Malaysia | 2017 | Bern, Switzerland | Sharrina Abdullah |
| Malawi | 14.10.2008 | Brussels, Belgium | Brave Rona Ndisale |
| Maldives | 16.11.2010 | Geneva, Switzerland | Iruthisham Adam |
| Mali | 19.10.2006 | Geneva, Switzerland | Sidiki Lamine Sow |
| Malta | 01.07.2008 | La Valette, Malta | Leslie Agius |
| Mauritania | 16.11.2010 | Geneva, Switzerland | Cheikh Ahmed Ould Zahave |
| Mauritius | | Paris, France | vacant |
| Mexico | 03.10.2007 | Bern, Switzerland | Luciano Joublanc Montano |
| Moldova | 27.03.2012 | Geneva, Switzerland | Victor Moraru |
| Monaco | 11.01.2007 | Bern, Switzerland | Robert Fillon |
| Mongolia | 24.11.2009 | Berlin, Germany | Orgil Luvsantseren |
| Montenegro | 11.01.2011 | Geneva, Switzerland | Ljubisa Perović |
| Morocco | 10.03.2009 | Bern, Switzerland | Mohammed Said Benryane |
| Mozambique | 19.10.2006 | Geneva, Switzerland | Frances Victoria Velho Rodrigues |
| Myanmar | 26.06.2012 | Paris, France | |
| Namibia | 19.04.2007 | Brussels, Belgium | Hanno Rumpf |
| Nepal | 16.02.2012 | Geneva, Switzerland | Bhrigu Dhungana |
| Netherlands | 25.08.2015 | Bern, Switzerland | Anne Elisabeth Luwema |
| New Zealand | 11.01.2011 | Berlin, Germany | Peter Howard Rider |
| Nicaragua | 16.11.2010 | Geneva, Switzerland | Carlos Robelo Raffone |
| Niger | 11.04.2008 | Geneva, Switzerland | Adani Illo |
| Nigeria | 21.11.2017 | Bern, Switzerland | Baba Madugu |
| North Korea | 20.04.2010 | Bern, Switzerland | So Se Pyong |
| North Macedonia | 12.01.2010 | Bern, Switzerland | Ramadan Nazifi |
| Norway | 04.12.2008 | Bern, Switzerland | Rolf Trolle Andersen |
| Oman | 13.06.2012 | Berlin, Switzerland | Mohammed Salim Mabakhut Jadad Al Kathiri (Chargé d’Affaires a.i.) |
| Pakistan | 27.10.2011 | Bern, Switzerland | Bhounr Muhammad Saleem |
| Palestine | | | Ibrahim Khraishi (General Delegate) |
| Panama | 23.06.2011 | Paris, France | Henry Joseph Faarup Mauad |
| Paraguay | 12.01.2010 | Bern, Switzerland | Rodolfo Luis Gonzalez Garabelli |
| Peru | 03.09.2013 | Bern, Switzerland | Luis Juan Chuquihuara Chil |
| Philippines | 08.09.2011 | Bern, Switzerland | Leslie Baja |
| Poland | 01.07.2008 | Bern, Switzerland | Jarosław Robert Starzyk |
| Portugal | 26.06.2012 | Bern, Switzerland | João Nugent Ramos Pinto |
| Qatar | 15.01.2004 | Paris, France | Mohamed Jaham Abduaziz Alkuwari |
| Romania | 29.09.2011 | Bern, Switzerland | Anca Elena Opris |
| Russia | 27.03.2012 | Bern, Switzerland | Alexander Golovin |
| Rwanda | 29.09.2011 | Geneva, Switzerland | Soline Nyirahabimana |
| Samoa | 31.01.2012 | Brussels, Belgium | Amorette Faalupega Posini (Chargé d’Affaires a.i.) |
| San Marino | 15.01.2008 | City of San Marino, San Marino | Giuseppe Arzilli |
| Saudi Arabia | 13.01.2009 | Bern, Switzerland | Hazem M. S. Karakotly |
| Senegal | 27.03.2012 | Geneva, Switzerland | Fodé Seck |
| Serbia | 07.05.2009 | Bern, Switzerland | Milan Protić |
| Seychelles | 13.01.2009 | Paris, France | Claude Sylvestre Anthony Morel |
| Sierra Leone | 29.06.2010 | Berlin, Germany | Jongopie Siaka Stevens |
| Singapore | 15.01.2004 | Singapore, Singapore | Hwang Michael |
| Slovakia | 29.06.2010 | Bern, Switzerland | Jan Foltin |
| Slovenia | 30.06.2009 | Bern, Switzerland | Bojan Grobovsek |
| South Africa | 07.05.2009 | Bern, Switzerland | George Henry Johannes |
| South Korea | 16.01.2018 | Bern, Switzerland | Kwon Haeryong |
| Sovereign Military Order of Malta | 03.10.2003 | Vienna, Austria | Maximilian Turnauer |
| Spain | 20.06.2017 | Bern, Switzerland | Aurora Díaz-Rato Revuelta |
| Sri Lanka | 10.01.2012 | Berlin, Germany | Upali Sarrath Kongahage |
| Sudan | 10.01.2012 | Geneva, Switzerland | Abdelrahman Mohamed Abdalla Dhirar |
| Swaziland | 01.07.2010 | Brussels, Belgium | Siphelele Welcome Dludlu |
| Sweden | 19.10.2006 | Bern, Switzerland | Per Anders Thöresson |
| Syria | 24.11.2009 | Paris, France | Lamia Chakkour |
| Tajikistan | 07.04.2011 | Geneva, Switzerland | Salokhiddin Nasriddinov |
| Tanzania | 07.04.2011 | Berlin, Germany | Ahmada Rweyemamu Ngemera |
| Thailand | 05.05.2011 | Germany, Switzerland | Arbhorn Manasvanich |
| Timor-Leste | 07.05.2009 | Geneva, Switzerland | Joaquim Antonio Maria Lopes da Fonseca |
| Togo | 26.06.2012 | Geneva, Switzerland | Nakpa Polo |
| Tonga | 01.07.2008 | London, UK | Sione Ngongo Kioa |
| Trinidad and Tobago | 27.10.2011 | Brussels, Belgium | Margaret King-Rousseau |
| Tunisia | 29.09.2011 | Bern, Switzerland | Hafedh Bejar |
| Turkey | 30.03.2021 | Bern, Switzerland | Emine Ece Ozbayoglu Acarso |
| Turkmenistan | 11.04.2011 | Geneva, Switzerland | Esen Aydogdyev |
| Uganda | 08.09.2009 | Geneva, Switzerland | Maurice Kiwanuka Kagimu |
| Ukraine | 29.05.2008 | Bern, Switzerland | Ihor Dir |
| United Arab Emirates | 30.03.2021 | Bern, Switzerland | Hissa Abdulla Ahmed Al Otaiba |
| United Kingdom | 16.01.2018 | Bern, Switzerland | Jane Owen |
| United States | 11.01.2022 | Bern, Switzerland | Scott Miller |
| Uruguay | 24.11.2009 | Bern, Switzerland | Luis Ricardo Nario Fagundez |
| Uzbekistan | 23.06.2011 | Berlin, Germany | Dilshod Akhatov |
| Venezuela | 15.10.2009 | Bern, Switzerland | César Osvelio Mendez Gonzalez |
| Vietnam | 18.05.2012 | Bern, Switzerland | Pham Hoang Kim (Chargé d’Affaires a.i.) |
| Yemen | 11.04.2008 | Geneva, Switzerland | Ibrahim Saied Mohamed Aladoofi |
| Zambia | 25.04.2012 | Paris, France | Hendrix Kapaipi (Chargé d’Affaires a.i.) |
| Zimbabwe | 07.04.2011 | Berlin, Germany | Hebson Hazvina Mudadirwa Makuvise |

== See also ==
- Foreign relations of Switzerland
- List of diplomatic missions of Switzerland
- List of diplomatic missions in Switzerland
