= Prince Stefan of Liechtenstein =

Liechtenstein prince and diplomat (born 1961)

His Serene Highness Prince Stefan of Liechtenstein Count of Rietberg
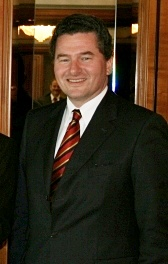
- Prince Stefan in 2008

Ambassador of Liechtenstein to Switzerland
- In office June 2001 – 21 June 2007
- Preceded by: Prince Wolfgang
- Succeeded by: Hubert Büchel

Ambassador of Liechtenstein to Germany
- In office 26 March 2007 – July 2017
- Preceded by: Josef Wolf

Ambassador of Liechtenstein to the Holy See
- Incumbent
- Assumed office December 2017
- Preceded by: Prince Nikolaus of Liechtenstein

Personal details
- Born: 14 November 1961 (age 65) Klagenfurt, Austria
- Spouse(s): Countess Florentine of Thun and Hohenstein (m. 1988)
- Children: Prince Lukas; Prince Konrad; Princess Anna; Princess Rita
- Parent(s): Prince Alexander of Liechtenstein; Princess Josephine of Löwenstein-Wertheim-Rosenberg
- Education: University of Innsbruck

Prince Stefan of Liechtenstein (Stefan Carl Manfred Alfred Alexander Joseph Maria; born 14 November 1961) is a Liechtenstein diplomat and member of the princely family. He has served as Liechtenstein's Ambassador Extraordinary and Plenipotentiary to the Holy See since 2017. He formerly served as Liechtenstein's Ambassador to Germany from 2007 to 2017 and to Switzerland from 2001 to 2007.

== Personal life ==
Prince Stefan was born in Klagenfurt, Austria, and grew up on the family estate in Rosegg, a Carinthian town close to the Slovenian border. His parents are Prince Alexander of Liechtenstein and Princess Josephine of Löwenstein-Wertheim-Rosenberg. Prince Stefan and his twin brother, the physician Prince Christian, are the elder two of the couple's three sons, the third one being Prince Emanuel. Prince Stefan belongs to the most junior extant line of the House of Liechtenstein, being descended from Prince Johann I Joseph's son Eduard Franz. His maternal uncle is Alois-Konstantin, 9th Prince of Löwenstein-Wertheim-Rosenberg, and he is a fifth cousin-once removed of Liechtenstein's present sovereign, Prince Hans-Adam II.

Prince Stefan entered a dynastic marriage with Countess Florentine of Thun und Hohenstein in Vienna on 18 June 1988. Prince Stefan and Princess Florentine have four children: Prince Lukas (b. 1990), Prince Konrad (b. 1992, m. Catalina de Biolley), Princess Anna (b. 1994), and Princess Rita (b. 1999).

== Education and career ==
Having attended school in Carinthia, Prince Stefan studied business administration at the University of Innsbruck. At the beginning of 1987, he received his master's degree. From 1988 until 1991, he worked for the Union Bank of Switzerland (UBS) in Zurich, and then for the same bank in Frankfurt as director for investment banking until 1995. From 1995 until 2001, Prince Stefan and his younger brother Emanuel ran a tourism project on the family estate in Rosegg.

Prince Stefan became Ambassador of Liechtenstein to Switzerland in June 2001. He performed the function until the summer of 2007. In March 2007, he became Liechtenstein's third Ambassador Extraordinary and Plenipotentiary to Germany. In 2008, German authorities accused Liechtenstein of using its status as tax haven to help tax evaders escape prosecution and paid for stolen information on hundreds of investors. Prince Stefan defended his country's policy, saying: "One can't always assume that every customer who comes through the door is a criminal. We're not going to change our whole legal system, a system which includes the protection of the privacy of our citizens."

== See also ==
- Maria-Pia Kothbauer, Princess of Liechtenstein - Liechtenstein's Ambassador Extraordinary and Plenipotentiary to Austria and the Czech Republic
- Prince Nikolaus of Liechtenstein - Former Liechtenstein's Ambassador Extraordinary and Plenipotentiary to the Holy See

Diplomatic posts
Preceded by Josef Wolf	Ambassador of Liechtenstein to Germany; 2007–2017	Succeeded by
Lines of succession
Preceded by Prince Johannes	Line of succession to the Liechtensteiner throne 50th position	Succeeded by Prince Lukas
