= Prince Stefan =

Prince Stefan may refer to:

- Prince Stefan of Liechtenstein (born 1961), Liechtenstein's Ambassador to Germany
- Prince Stefan (actor) (born 1989), Filipino actor
