= List of ambassadors to Germany =

This is a list of ambassadors of Germany. Note that some ambassadors are responsible for more than one country while others are directly accredited to Berlin.

== Current Ambassadors to Berlin ==
Sending country	Presentation of the credentials	Location of resident embassy	Ambassador	Embassy website
Afghanistan	31.10.2018	Berlin, Germany	Abdul J. Ariyaee (acting ambassador)	
Albania	27.03.2014	Berlin, Germany	Artur Kuko	
Algeria	27.03.2014	Berlin, Germany	Nor Eddine Aouam	
Andorra	11.12.2015	Brussels, Belgium	Maria Ubach Font	
Angola	24.10.2019	Berlin, Germany	Balbina Malheiros Días Da Silva	
Antigua and Barbuda	11.07.2006	London, UK	Carl B. W. Roberts	
Argentina	14.04.2016	Berlin, Germany	Luis Maria Kreckler	
Armenia	08.07.2015	Berlin, Germany	Ashot Smbatyan	
Australia	28.09.2016	Berlin, Germany	Lynette Margaret Wood	
Austria	17.02.2015	Berlin, Germany	Nicolaus Marschik	
Azerbaijan	11.10.2016	Berlin, Germany	Ramin Hasanov	
Bahamas	29.10.2009	London, UK	Paul H. Farquharson	
Bahrain	19.10.2011	Berlin, Germany	Ebrahim Mahmood Ahmed Abdulla	
Bangladesh	17.01.2017	Berlin, Germany	Imtiaz Ahmed	
Barbados	07.11.2012	Brussels, Belgium	Samuel Jefferson Chandler	
Belarus	13.12.2016	Berlin, Germany	Denis Sidorenko	
Belgium	14.10.2014	Berlin, Germany	Ghislain Jean M. D'Hoop	
Belize	14.10.2014	Brussels, Belgium	Dylan Vernon	
Benin	05.01.2017	Berlin, Germany	Josseline Louise Marie da Silva Gbony	
Bhutan		Brussels, Belgium	vacant	
Bolivia	02.06.2016	Berlin, Germany	Jorge Cardenas Robles	
Bosnia and Herzegovina	23.09.2015	Berlin, Germany	Željko Janjetović	
Botswana	16.07.2014	Berlin, Germany	Tswelopele Cornelia Moremi	
Brazil	08.11.2016	Berlin, Germany	Mario Vilalva	
Brunei	19.05.2015	Berlin, Germany	Krtini Tahir	
Bulgaria	24.02.2012	Berlin, Germany	Radi Dragnev Naidenov	
Burkina Faso	10.11.2015	Berlin, Germany	Simplice Honoré Guibila	
Burundi	14.02.2024	Berlin, Germany	Annonciata Sendazirasa	
Cambodia	19.02.2014	Berlin, Germany	Sopanha Duch (Chargé d'Affaires a. i.)	
Cameroon	09.01.2009	Berlin, Germany	Jean-Marc Mpay	
Canada	27.09.2013	Berlin, Germany	Marie Gervais-Vidricaire	
Cape Verde	10.11.2015	Berlin, Germany	Jacqueline Maria Duarte Pires Ferreira Pires	
Central African Republic		Paris, France	vacant	
Chad	08.07.2015	Berlin, Germany	Abdoulaye Senoussi Mahamat	
Chile	02.06.2016	Berlin, Germany	Patricio Alberto Pradel Elgueta	
China	24.08.2012	Berlin, Germany	Shi Mingde	
Colombia	29.08.2016	Berlin, Germany	Maria Lorena Gutierrez Botero	
Comoros	25.04.2014	Brussels, Belgium	Said Mdahoma Ali	
Congo	24.09.2012	Berlin, Germany	Jacques Yvon Ndolou	
Costa Rica	29.08.2016	Berlin, Germany	Gian Carlo Luconi Coen	
Côte d'Ivoire	07.04.2008	Berlin, Germany	Houadja Leon Adom Kacou	
Croatia	27.09.2013	Berlin, Germany	Ranko Vilovic	
Cuba	21.10.2013	Berlin, Germany	René Juan Mujica Cantelar	
Cyprus	14.06.2012	Berlin, Germany	Minas A. Hadjimichael	
Czech Republic	08.01.2015	Berlin, Germany	Tomás Jan Podivinsky	
Democratic Republic of Congo	11.11.2009	Berlin, Germany	Kamanga Clementine Shakembo	
Denmark	27.08.2015	Berlin, Germany	Friis Arne Petersen	
Djibouti	24.11.2011	Berlin, Germany	Aden Mohamed Dileita	
Dominica		Brussels, Belgium	vacant	
Dominican Republic	19.08.2009	Berlin, Germany	Gabriel Rafael Ant Jose Calventi Gavino	
Ecuador	06.07.2016	Berlin, Germany	Diego Fernando Moréjon Pazmino	
Egypt	29.09.2015	Berlin, Germany	Badr Ahmed Mohamed Abdelatty	
El Salvador	28.05.2010	Berlin, Germany	Florencia Eugenia Vilanova de Von Oehsen (Chargé d'Affaires a. i.)	
Eritrea	01.03.2005	Berlin, Germany	Petros Tseggai Asghedom	
Equatorial Guinea	14.04.2016	Berlin, Germany	Pantaleon Mayiboro Miko Nchama	
Estonia	29.08.2016	Berlin, Germany	William Mart Laanemäe	
Ethiopia	24.04.2015	Berlin, Germany	Kuma Demeksa Tokon	
Fiji	08.02.2013	London, UK	Naivakarurubalavu Solo Mara	
Finland	28.09.2015	Berlin, Germany	Ritva Inkeri Koukku-Ronde	
France	02.09.2014	Berlin, Germany	Philippe Noël Marie Marc Etienne	
Gabon	30.11.2015	Berlin, Germany	Jean Marie Maguena	
Gambia	07.04.2009	Brussels, Belgium	Mamour A. Jagne	
Georgia	19.02.2014	Berlin, Germany	Lado Chanturia	
Ghana	29.10.2009	Berlin, Germany	Francis Danti Kotia (Chargé d'Affaires a. i.)	
Greece	28.09.2015	Berlin, Germany	Theodoros Daskarolis	
Grenada	01.06.2011	Brussels, Belgium	Stephen Fletcher	
Guatemala	08.11.2016	Berlin, Germany	José Francisco Calí Tzay	
Guinea	04.03.2015	Berlin, Germany	Fatoumata Balde	
Guinea-Bissau	16.01.2012	Berlin, Germany	Malam Jassi	
Guyana		Brussels, Belgium	vacant	
Haiti	14.07.2010	Berlin, Germany	Michèle Dominique Raymond (Chargé d'Affaires a. i.)	
Holy See	20.11.2013	Berlin, Germany	Nikola Eterovic	
Honduras	24.09.2012	Berlin, Germany	Ramon Custodio Espinoza	
Hungary	10.11.2015	Berlin, Germany	Péter Imre Györkös	
Iceland	29.08.2016	Berlin, Germany	Martin Eyjólfsson	
India	03.02.2016	Berlin, Germany	Gurjit Singh	
Indonesia	19.02.2014	Berlin, Germany	Fauzi Bowo	
Iran	14.10.2014	Berlin, Germany	Ali Majedi	
Iraq	13.12.2016	Berlin, Germany	Dhia Hadi Mahmoud Al-Dabbass	
Ireland	August 2019	Berlin, Germany	Nicholas O’Brien	
Israel	09.03.2012	Berlin, Germany	Yakov-David Hadas-Handelsman	
Italy	23.09.2014	Berlin, Germany	Pietro Benassi	
Jamaica	20.11.2013	Berlin, Germany	Margaret Jobson	
Japan	03.02.2016	Berlin, Germany	Takeshi Yagi	
Jordan	15.12.2011	Berlin, Germany	Muhib Mahmoud Ahmad Nimrat (Chargé d'Affaires a. i.)	
Kazakhstan	12.03.2008	Berlin, Germany	Nurlan Onzhanov	
Kenya	04.03.2015	Berlin, Germany	Joseph Kipng'etich Magutt	
Kosovo	19.06.2012	Berlin, Germany	Skender Xhakaliu	
Kuwait	21.10.2013	Berlin, Germany	Monther Bader Sulaiman Aleissa	
Kyrgyzstan	23.09.2015	Berlin, Germany	Erines Otorbaev	
Laos	04.03.2015	Berlin, Germany	Sithong Chitnhothinh	
Latvia	06.09.2013	Berlin, Germany	Elita Kuzma	
Lebanon	18.07.2013	Berlin, Germany	Mustapha Abid-Abdul-Wahed	
Lesotho	02.02.2016	Berlin, Germany	Matseliso Patricia Motsamai (Chargé d'Affaires a. i.)	
Liberia	13.12.2010	Berlin, Germany	Ethel Davis	
Libya	17.08.2011	Berlin, Germany	Aly Masednah Idris El-Kothany (Chargé d'Affaires a. i.)	
Liechtenstein	29.08.2017	Berlin, Germany	Isabel Frommelt-Gottschald	
Lithuania	07.11.2012	Berlin, Germany	Deividas Matulionis	
Luxembourg	24.09.2012	Berlin, Germany	Georges Joseph Nicolas Santer	
Madagascar		Berlin, Germany	Florence Isabelle Rafaramalala Ep. Ratsimba (Chargé d'Affaires a. i.)	
Malawi	11.11.2015	Berlin, Germany	Michael Barth Kamphambe Nkhoma	
Malaysia	19.05.2015	Berlin, Germany	Zulkifli Bin Adnan	
Maldives		Berlin, Germany	Shiruzimath Sameer (Chargé d'Affaires a. i.)	
Mali	11.12.2015	Berlin, Germany	Toumani Djime Diallo	
Malta	16.09.2020	Berlin, Germany	Vanni Xuereb	
Marshall Islands	25.06.2010	New York City, US	Philip Henry Muller	
Mauritania	03.07.2014	Berlin, Germany	Mohamed Mahmoud Brahim Khlil	
Mauritius	23.09.2015	Berlin, Germany	Kheswar Jankee	
Mexico		Berlin, Germany	Alejandro Rivera Becerra (Chargé d'Affaires a. i.)	
Moldova	06.01.2016	Berlin, Germany	Oleg Serebrian	
Monaco	27.08.2015	Berlin, Germany	Isabelle Paule Jeanne Berro	
Mongolia	25.04.2014	Berlin, Germany	Bolor Tsolmon	
Montenegro	02.03.2016	Berlin, Germany	Ranko Vujačić	
Morocco	16.01.2012	Berlin, Germany	Omar Zniber	
Mozambique	24.11.2011	Berlin, Germany	Amadeu Paulo Samuel da Conceição	
Myanmar	19.05.2015	Berlin, Germany	Yin Yin Myint	
Namibia		Berlin, Germany	Joseph Ashipala (Chargé d'Affaires a. i.)	
Nepal	11.10.2016	Berlin, Germany	Ramesh Prasad Khanal	
Netherlands	26.08.2013	Berlin, Germany	Monica Theodora Geertruida Van Daalen	
New Zealand	18.07.2022	Berlin, Germany	Craig Hawke	
Nicaragua	2014	Berlin, Germany	Karla Luzette Beteta Brenes	
Niger	02.03.2016	Berlin, Germany	Boubacar Boureima	
Nigeria		Berlin, Germany	Chimezie Okeoma Ogu (Chargé d'Affaires a. i.)	
North Korea	23.11.2015	Berlin, Germany	Yong U Sin	
North Macedonia	24.04.2015	Berlin, Germany	Sasho Markovski	
Norway	08.01.2015	Berlin, Germany	Elisabeth Walaas	
Oman	13.12.2016	Berlin, Germany	Lyutha Sultan Ahmed Al Mughairy	
Pakistan	03.02.2016	Berlin, Germany	Jauhar Saleem	
Palau	08.01.2010	Melekeok, Palau	Carlos Hiroshi Salii	
Palestine	28.08.2013	Berlin, Germany	Khouloud Daibes	
Panama	06.01.2016	Berlin, Germany	Guido Spadafora Mejia	
Papua New Guinea	02.09.2014	Brussels, Belgium	Joshua Rimarkindu Kalinoe	
Paraguay	17.02.2015	Berlin, Germany	Fernando Daniel Ojeda Caceres	
Peru	13.04.2011	Berlin, Germany	Rosa Liliana Gomez Cardenas de Weston (Chargé d'Affaires a. i.)	
Philippines	04.03.2015	Berlin, Germany	Melita Sta. Maria-Thomeczek	
Poland	01.07.2016	Berlin, Germany	Andrzej Przyłębski	
Portugal	30.11.2015	Berlin, Germany	Joao Antonio Da Costa Mira Gomes	
Qatar	11.11.2009	Berlin, Germany	Abdulrahman Mohammed S. Al-Khulaifi	
Romania	30.11.2015	Berlin, Germany	Emilian Horatiu Hurezeanu	
Russia	03.08.2010	Berlin, Germany	Vladimir Grinin	
Rwanda	27.08.2015	Berlin, Germany	Igor Cesar	
Saint Kitts and Nevis		London, UK	vacant	
Saint Lucia		London, UK	vacant	
Samoa	13.01.2014	Brussels, Belgium	Fatumanava Pa'olelei Luteru	
San Marino	12.12.2007	Brussels, Belgium	Gian Nicola Filippi Balestra	
Sao Tome and Principe		Brussels, Belgium	Horacio Fernandes Da Fonseca (Chargé d'Affaires a. i.)	
Saudi Arabia	11.12.2015	Berlin, Germany	Awwad Saleh A Alawwad	
Senegal	08.11.2016	Berlin, Germany	Momar Gueye	
Serbia	11.12.2015	Berlin, Germany	Dušan Crnogorcević	
Seychelles	02.03.2016	Brussels, Belgium	Selby Thomas Pillay	
Sierra Leone	28.04.2009	Berlin, Germany	Jongopie Siaka Stevens	
Singapore	28.09.2016	Berlin, Germany	Laurence Bay Siow Hon	
Slovakia	08.07.2015	Berlin, Germany	Peter Lizák	
Slovenia	27.06.2022	Berlin, Germany	Ana Polak Petrič	
Solomon Islands	03.02.2016	Brussels, Belgium	Moses Kouni Mose	
Somalia	12.03.2008	Berlin, Germany	Mohamud Mohamed Tifow	
South Africa	11.10.2016	Berlin, Germany	Phumelele Stone Sizani	
South Sudan	24.08.2012	Berlin, Germany	Sitona Abdalla Osman	
South Korea	07.12.2020	Berlin, Germany	Cho Hyun-ok	
Spain		Berlin, Germany	Juan Antonio Martin Burgos (Chargé d'Affaires a. i.)	
Sri Lanka	02.09.2014	Berlin, Germany	Karunatilaka Amunugama	
Sudan	16.07.2014	Berlin, Germany	Badreldin Abdalla Mohamed Ahmed A. Alla	
Suriname		The Hague, Netherlands	vacant	
Swaziland		Brussels, Belgium	Philile Masuku (Chargé d'Affaires a. i.)	
Sweden		Berlin, Germany	Erik Staffan Hemra (Chargé d'Affaires a. i.)	
Switzerland	27.08.2015	Berlin, Germany		
Syria	10.03.2011	Berlin, Germany	Bashar Alassaed (Chargé d'Affaires a. i.)	
Tajikistan	16.07.2014	Berlin, Germany	Maliksho Nematov	
Tanzania	06.06.2017	Berlin, Germany	Abdallah Possi	
Thailand	29.08.2016	Berlin, Germany	Dhiravat Bhumichtir	
Togo		Berlin, Germany	Tchaa Batchassi Gnama (Chargé d'Affaires a. i.)	
Tonga	14.02.2008	London, UK	Sione Ngongo Kioa	
Trinidad and Tobago		London, UK	Darcyl Legall (Chargé d'Affaires a. i.)	
Tunisia	30.11.2015	Berlin, Germany	Elyes Kasri	
Turkey	13.12.2016	Berlin, Germany	Ali Kemal Aydin	
Turkmenistan	03.07.2014	Berlin, Germany	Toyly Atayev	
Uganda	18.07.2013	Berlin, Germany	Marcel Robert Tibaleka	
Ukraine	12.01.2015	Berlin, Germany	Andrii Melnyk	
United Arab Emirates	02.06.2016	Berlin, Germany	Ali Abdulla Mohamed Saeed Alahmed	
United Kingdom	28.09.2015	Berlin, Germany	Sebastian Wood	
United States		Berlin, Germany	Alan Meltzer (Chargé d'Affaires a. i.)	
Uruguay	05.2023	Berlin, Germany	Fernando Lopez Fabrega	
Uzbekistan	10.25.2024	Berlin, Germany	Dilshod Akhatov	
Venezuela	17.02.2015	Berlin, Germany	Ramon Orlando Maniglia Ferreira	
Vietnam	10.11.2015	Berlin, Germany	Xuan Hung Doan	
Yemen	28.09.2016	Berlin, Germany	Yahia Mohammed Abdullah Al-Shaibi	
Zambia	14.06.2012	Berlin, Germany	Bwalya Stanley Kasonde Chiti	
Zimbabwe	08.01.2015	Berlin, Germany	Ruth Masodzi Chikwira	

== See also ==
- Foreign relations of Germany
- List of diplomatic missions of Germany
- List of diplomatic missions in Germany
