= Hubert Büchel (diplomat) =

Liechtenstein diplomat (born 1951)

Liechtenstein Ambassador to Switzerland
- In office 21 June 2007 – 26 March 2013
- Monarchs: Hans-Adam II; Alois (regent)
- Preceded by: Prince Stefan of Liechtenstein
- Succeeded by: Doris Frick

Personal details
- Born: 30 November 1951 (age 74) Feldkirch, Austria
- Party: Progressive Citizens' Party

Hubert Ferdinand Büchel (born 30 November 1951) is a former diplomat from Liechtenstein who served as the ambassador to Switzerland from 2007 to 2013.

Büchel previously served as the head of the Liechtenstein economic affairs office from 1994 to 2007. Following the October 1993 general election, he was a candidate for the Deputy Prime Minister of Liechtenstein as a member of the Progressive Citizens' Party, but the party ultimately went with Thomas Büchel instead.

He is from Ruggell.
