= Ruth Masodzi Chikwira =

Ambassador

Ruth Masodzi Chikwira is the ambassador of Zimbabwe to Germany with accreditation to Poland and Switzerland. In December 2019, she presented her letters of credence as Ambassador-designate to Canada.

Chikwira earned a bachelor's degree in administration from the University of Zimbabwe and a master's degree in business administration from the Free University of Brussels.
