= List of ambassadors of Liechtenstein to Switzerland =

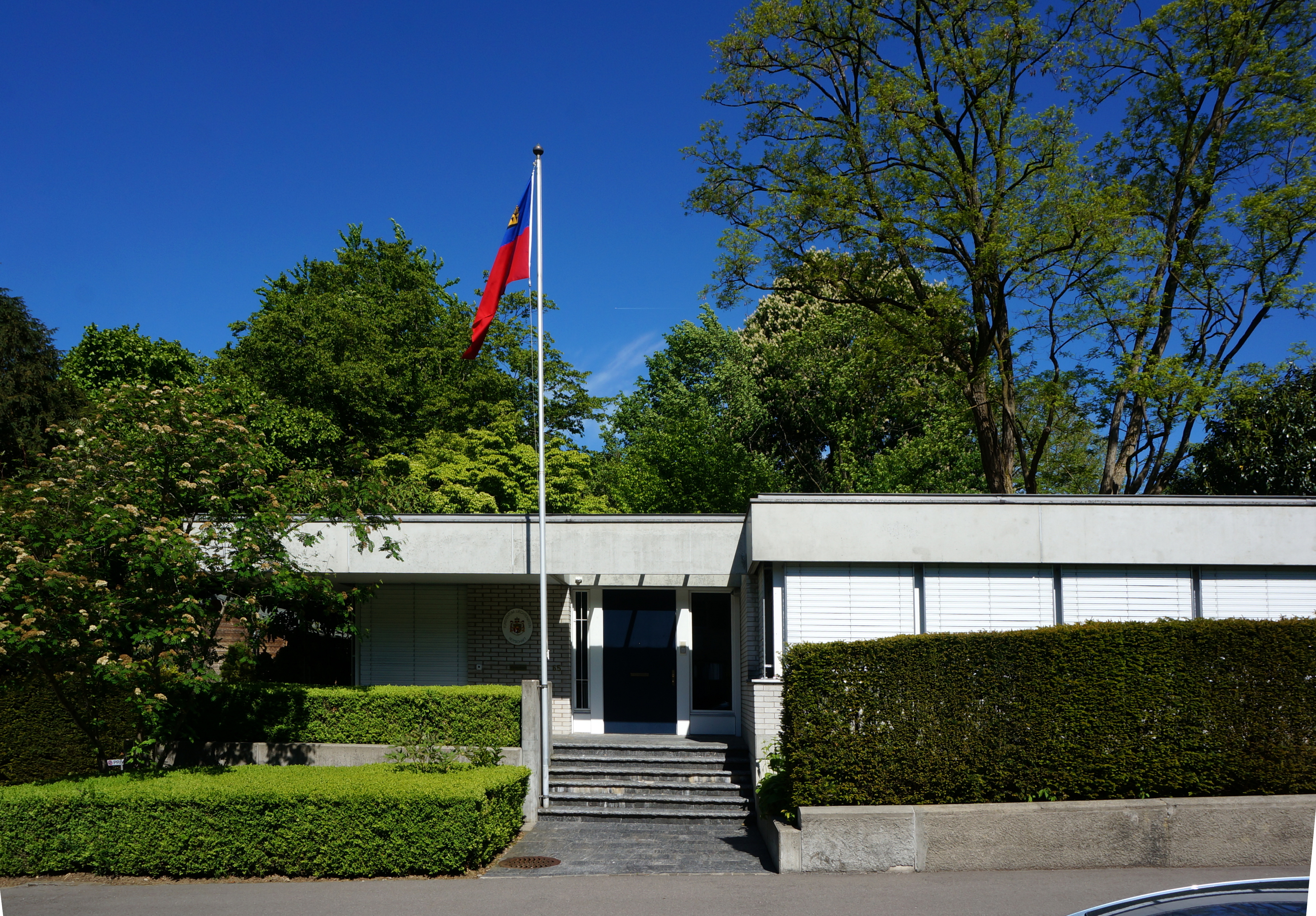
Liechtenstein embassy in Bern

Liechtenstein has maintained a permeant representative in Switzerland since 1969. Liechtenstein has an embassy in Bern and a consulate in Geneva.

== List of ambassadors (1969–present) ==
No.	Ambassador	Start	End	Reference(s)
1	Prince Heinrich Hartneid of Liechtenstein	1969	1989	
2	Prince Nikolaus of Liechtenstein	1989	1996	
3	Prince Wolfgang of Liechtenstein	July 1996	c. June 22 2001	
4	Prince Stefan of Liechtenstein	June 2001	21 June 2007	
5	Hubert Büchel	21 June 2007	26 March 2013	
6	Doris Frick	26 March 2013		

== See also ==
- Liechtenstein–Switzerland relations
