= Schloss Rosegg =

Austrian castle and zoo

Coordinates: 46.584°N 14.024°E

- Carinthia, Austria
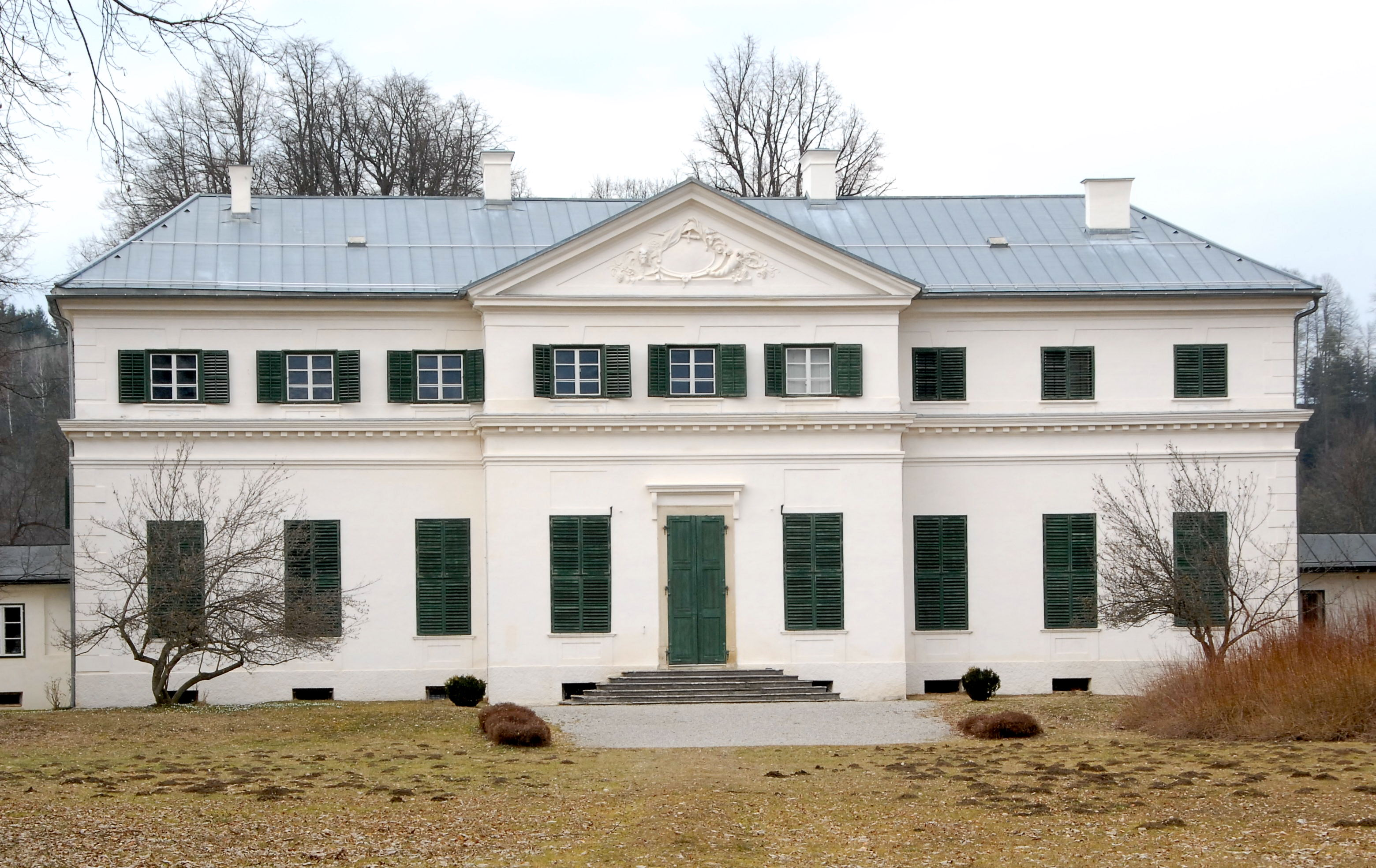

Site information
- Type: Castle

Schloss Rosegg is a castle in Rosegg, Carinthia, Austria. Schloss Rosegg is 478 metres (1,568 ft) above sea level.

The original castle was known as Altrosegg, built in the 12/13th centuries as a hilltop fort near lake Wörthersee. The current castle was built in 1772 by the Austrian noble Prince Franz Seraph von Orsini-Rosenberg of the house of Orsini-Rosenberg, the castle was built with Italianate architecture in mind, the furniture in the mansion are still from the 18th century. The second owner was Peter Ritter von Bohr who was acquainted with Francis II, Holy Roman Emperor in Austria, however Bohr was convicted of producing counterfeit money, and only lived in Rosegg for 2 years. The third and current owners of the castle have been a Royal family descending from the House of Liechtenstein. The mansion was purchased by Johann I Joseph, Prince of Liechtenstein in 1831 for one of his sons.

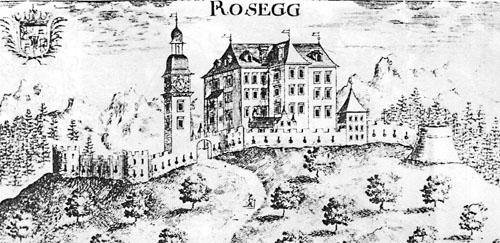
Original castle in Rosegg

The castle features a large wildlife park (zoo) with many animals, tours of the castle with rooms displays and life-size wax figures in period clothing, and also large hedge maze (labyrinth). Other activities include contemporary art exhibits, summer events, concerts, theater programs and there is also cafe.

== See also ==
- List of castles in Austria
