= Orsini-Rosenberg =

Austrian noble family

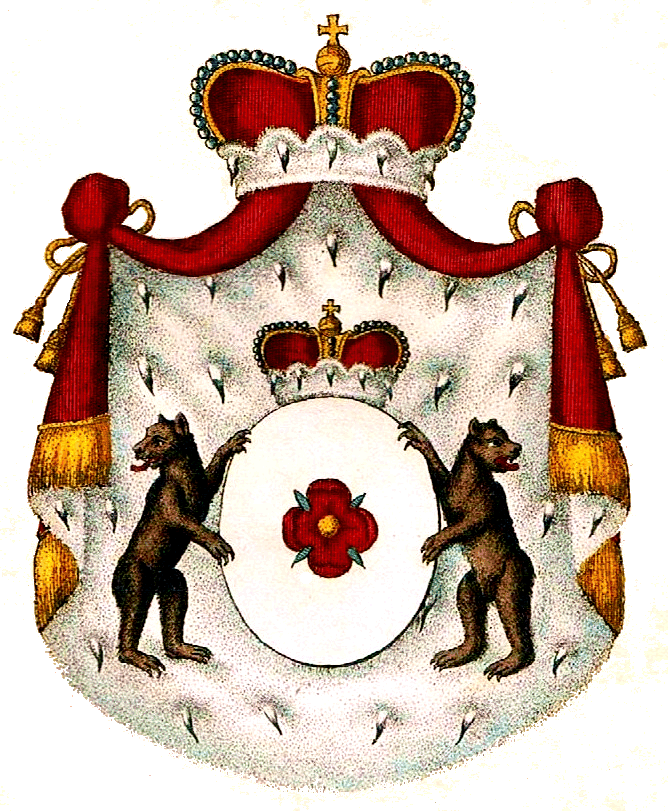
- Parent house: House of Graben von Stein
- Country: Austria
- Founded: first named in 1322
- Founder: Konrad ab dem Roesenperg
- Titles: Reichsfürst und Reichsgraf von Orsini und Rosenberg; Burggraf of Klagenfurt; Freiherr auf Lerchenau und Grafenstein

The House of Orsini-Rosenberg (also Ursin-Rosenberg) is the name of an old Austrian noble family. The family is mediatized and as such belongs to the high nobility. It originally sprang out from the Graben family (an apparent or illegitimate branch of the House of Meinhardin) from Castle Alt-Grabenhofen near the city of Graz.

== History ==
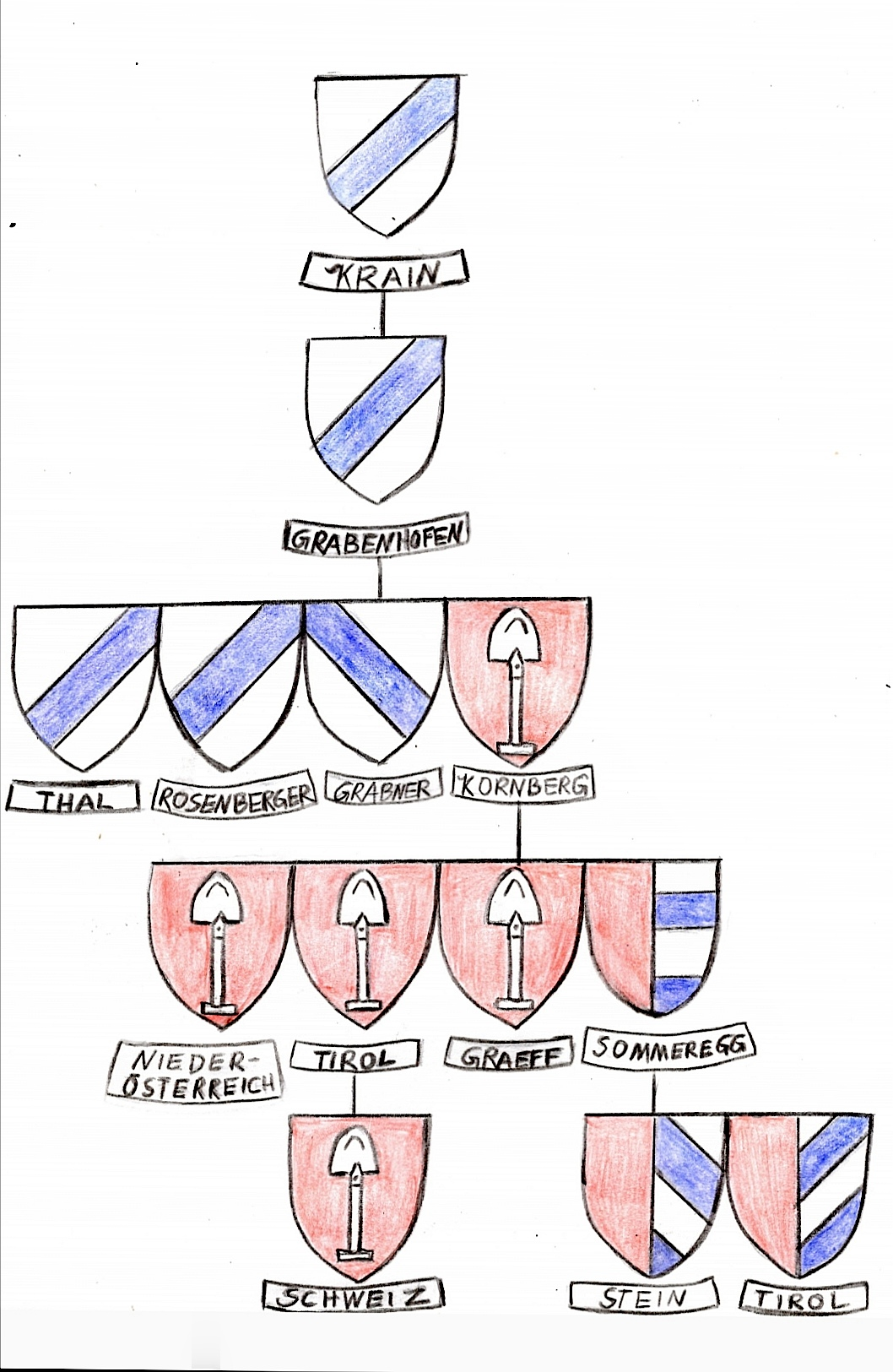
Heraldic family tree of the Graben and their descendants

The earliest known member of the Orsini-Rosenberg family, Konrad (von Graben) ab dem Roesenperg, lived around 1322. He was a member of the lower nobility who lived at Schloss Alt-Grabenhofen, between Reinerkogel and Rosenberg. During the 17th and 18th centuries, the success of the family arose from the steady accumulation of land, and loyalty to the Habsburg Emperor.

On 2 August 1633, Johann Andreas von Rosenberg, Herr von Rosenberg, was elevated to the Reichsfreiherrenstand with the title of Freiherr of the Holy Roman Empire, Freiherr of Lerchenau, Herr of Magereckh and Grafenstein, and in 1648 to the Austrian Grafenstand. Since 1681, the family held the title of Reichsgraf, and in 1683 they became members of the Reichstag. In the same year, they took the name of the old Italian princely Orsini family; their family name changed to Ursini-Rosenberg or Orsini-Rosenberg. On 9 October 1790, Count Franz Xaver Wolfgang was elevated to Reichsfürst von Orsini-Rosenberg.

== Notable members ==
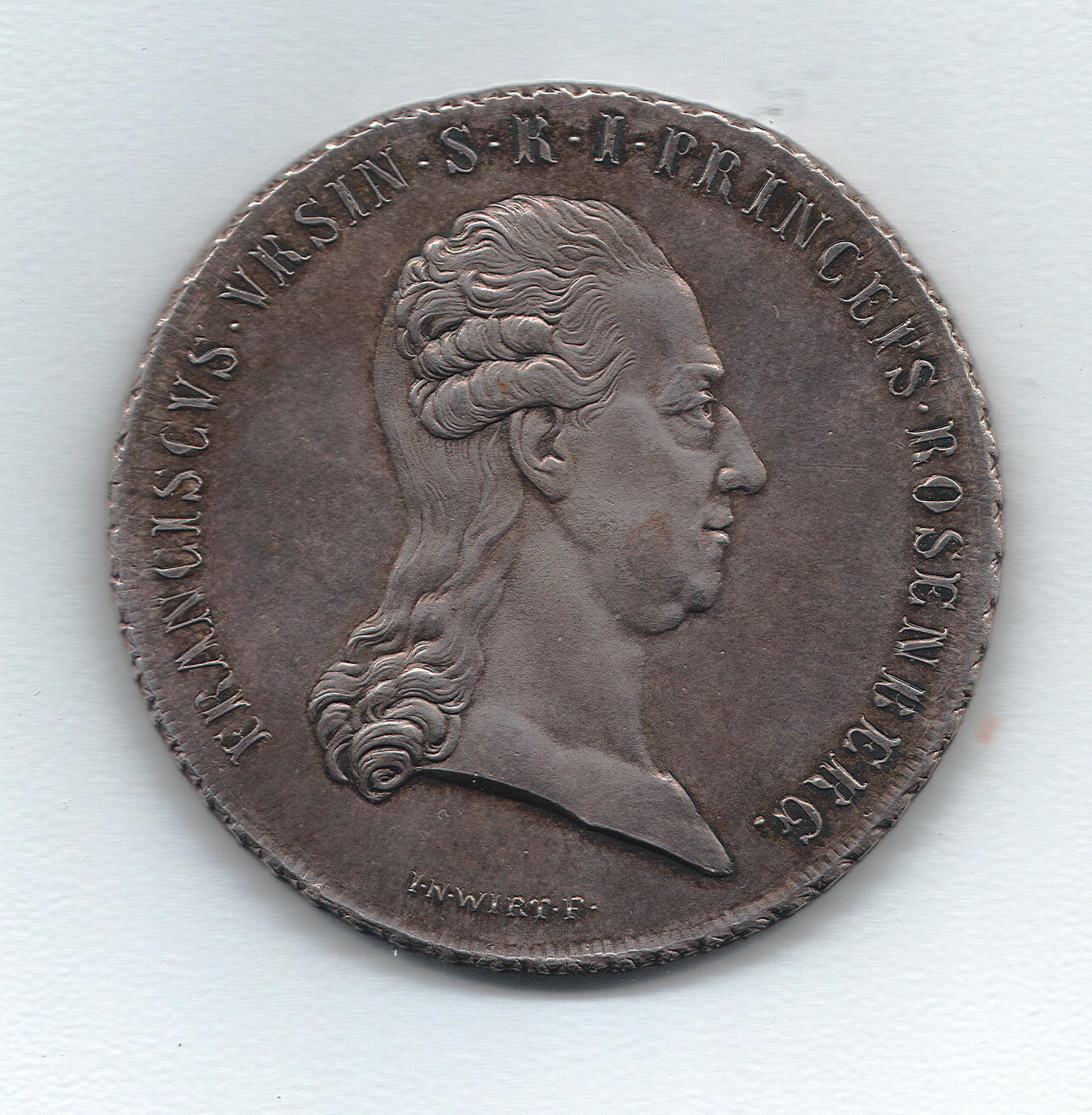
Franz Xaver von Orsini-Rosenberg

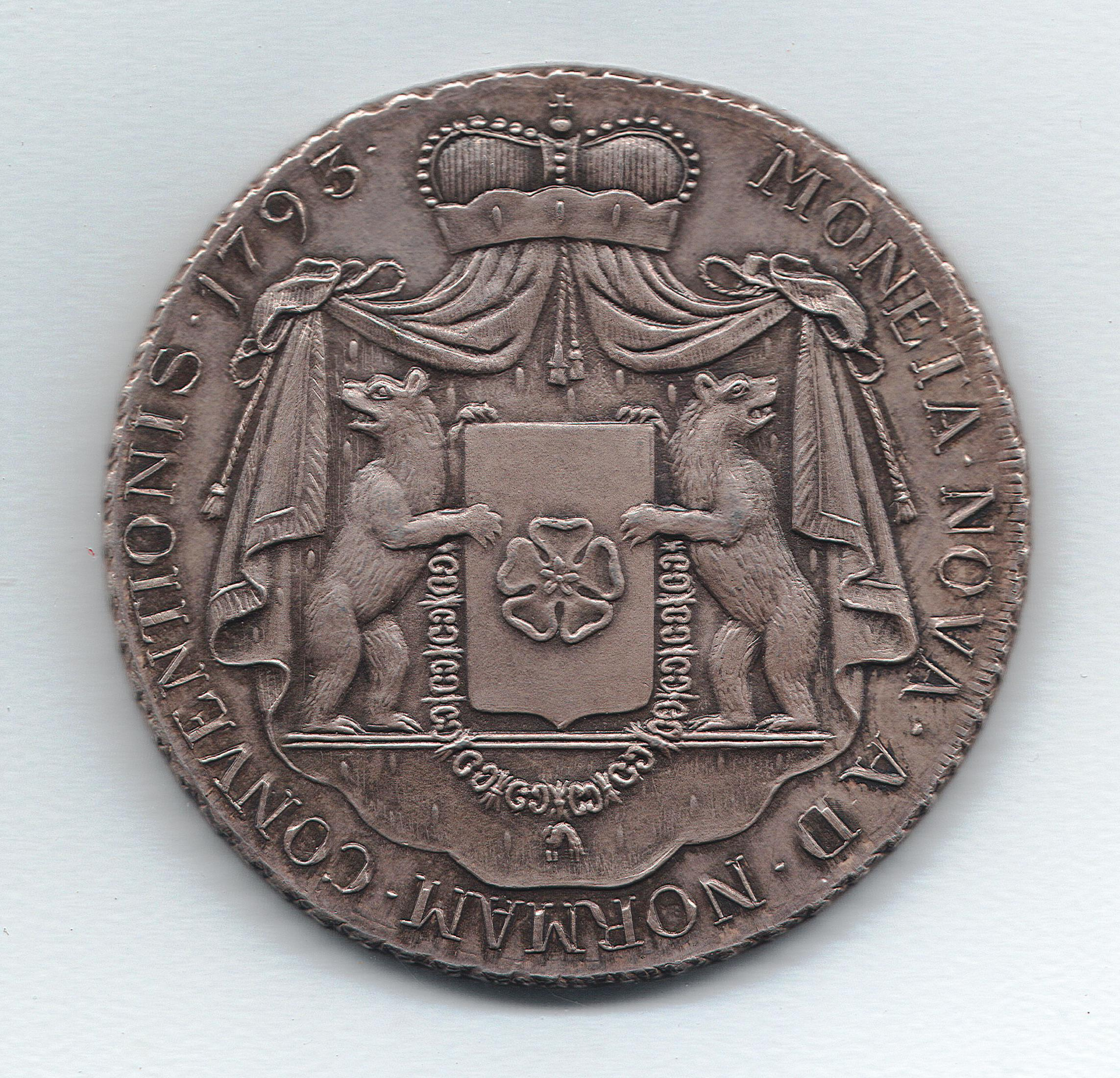
Thaler with the family arms (1793)

- Johann Andreas von Rosenberg (1600–1667), Baron of Rosenberg, then first Count of Rosenberg.
- Philipp von Orsini-Rosenberg (1691–1765), Austrian diplomat.
- Vinzenz von Orsini-Rosenberg (1722–1794), Landeshauptmann of Carinthia.
- Franz Xaver Wolfgang von Orsini-Rosenberg (1726–1795), diplomat and politician, was made first Count of the Holy Roman Empire of Orsini-Rosenberg and later first Prince of the Holy Roman Empire of Orsini-Rosenberg; he was the basis for the character Count Orsini-Rosenberg in the fictional work Amadeus.
- Prince Franz Seraph of Orsini-Rosenberg (1761–1832), Austrian General of Cavalry.

== Counts of Orsini-Rosenberg (1681) ==
- Johann Andreas, 1st Baron (1600–1667)
  - Georg Nikolaus, 1st Count (1623–1695)
    - Johann Friedrich, 2nd Count (1654–1723)
    - Count Josef Leopold (1670–1737)
    - Count Heinrich Georg (1678–1727)
  - Wolfgang Andreas, 1st Count (1626–1695)
    - Joseph Paris, 2nd Count (1651–1685)
      - Wolfgang Sigismund, 3rd Count (1682–1739)
        - Franz, 4th Count (1723–1795), created 1st Prince

== Princes of Orsini-Rosenberg (1790) ==
- Count Wolfgang Andreas (1626–1695)
  - Count Joseph Paris (1651–1685)
    - Count Wolfgang Sigismund (1682–1739)
      - Franz Xaver, 1st Prince 1790–1795 (1723–1795)
  - Count Franz Andreas (1653–1698)
  - Count Philipp Josef (1691–1765)
    - Count Vincenz Ferrerius (1722–1794)
      - Franz Seraph, 2nd Prince 1795–1832 (1761–1832)
        - Ferdinand, 3rd Prince 1832–1859 (1790-1859)
          - Heinrich, 4th Prince 1859–1929 (1848–1929)
            - Johannes, 5th Prince 1929–1932 (1893–1932)
              - Heinrich, 6th Prince 1932–2011 (1925–2011)
                - Johannes, 7th Prince 2011–2024 (1949–2024)
                  - Heinrich, 8th Prince 2024-Present (b.1979)
                  - Paul, Hereditary Prince of Orsini-Rosenberg (b.1982)
                - Count Ferdinand (b. 1953)
                  - Count Konrad (b. 1982)
                  - Count Ludwig (b. 1989)
                - Count Markus (b. 1955)
                  - Count Maximilian (b. 1988)
                - Count Mathias (b. 1955)
                  - Count Philipp (b. 1998)
                  - Count Douglas (b. 2000)
                  - Count Leopold (b. 2004)
              - Count Johann (1926-2004)
                - Count Andreas (b. 1954)
                  - Count Raphael (b. 1984)
                  - Count Luca (b. 1986)
                  - Count Luis (b. 1988)
                - Count Hubertus (b. 1962)
                  - Count Paul (b. 1999)
        - Prince Friedrich (1801-1887), male heirs exist

== Estates ==
- Grafenstein Castle, built in 1638 by Johann Andreas, still owned today.
- Klagenfurt Town Hall (formerly Palais Rosenberg), rebuilt around 1650 by Johann Andreas Rosenberg, owned 1650–1918.
- Palais Rosenberg in Klagenfurt (Old Town Hall (Klagenfurt am Wörthersee)), built around 1600 by the Welzer family, owned from 1918 until today.
- Sonnegg Castle near Sittersdorf, owned from 1636 to the present day.
- Maria-Loretto Castle on Lake Wörthersee, built in 1654 by Johann Andreas von Rosenberg, owned until 2002.
- Stein Castle (Dellach im Drautal) near Dellach in the Drautal, built before 1200, owned from 1681 to the present day.
- Palais Orsini-Rosenberg in Vienna, built in 1692 by Wolfgang Andreas, owned until 1718.
- Damtschach Castle near Wernberg, built in 1511 by Augustin Khevenhüller, owned since 1847 until today.
- Feuersberg Castle, still owned today.
- Höhenbergen Castle near Völkermarkt, construction began in the middle of the 18th century, unfinished, still in possession today.
- Welzenegg Castle near Klagenfurt, built in 1575 by Viktor Welzer, owned from 1670 to 1983.
- Keutschach am See Castle, built in 1679 by Georg Nicolaus, owned until 1926.
- Greifenburg Castle in the Drautal valley, built before 1166, owned 1676–1943.
- Rosegg Castle, built from 1772 by Franz Xaver Wolfgang, owned until 1829.
Estates

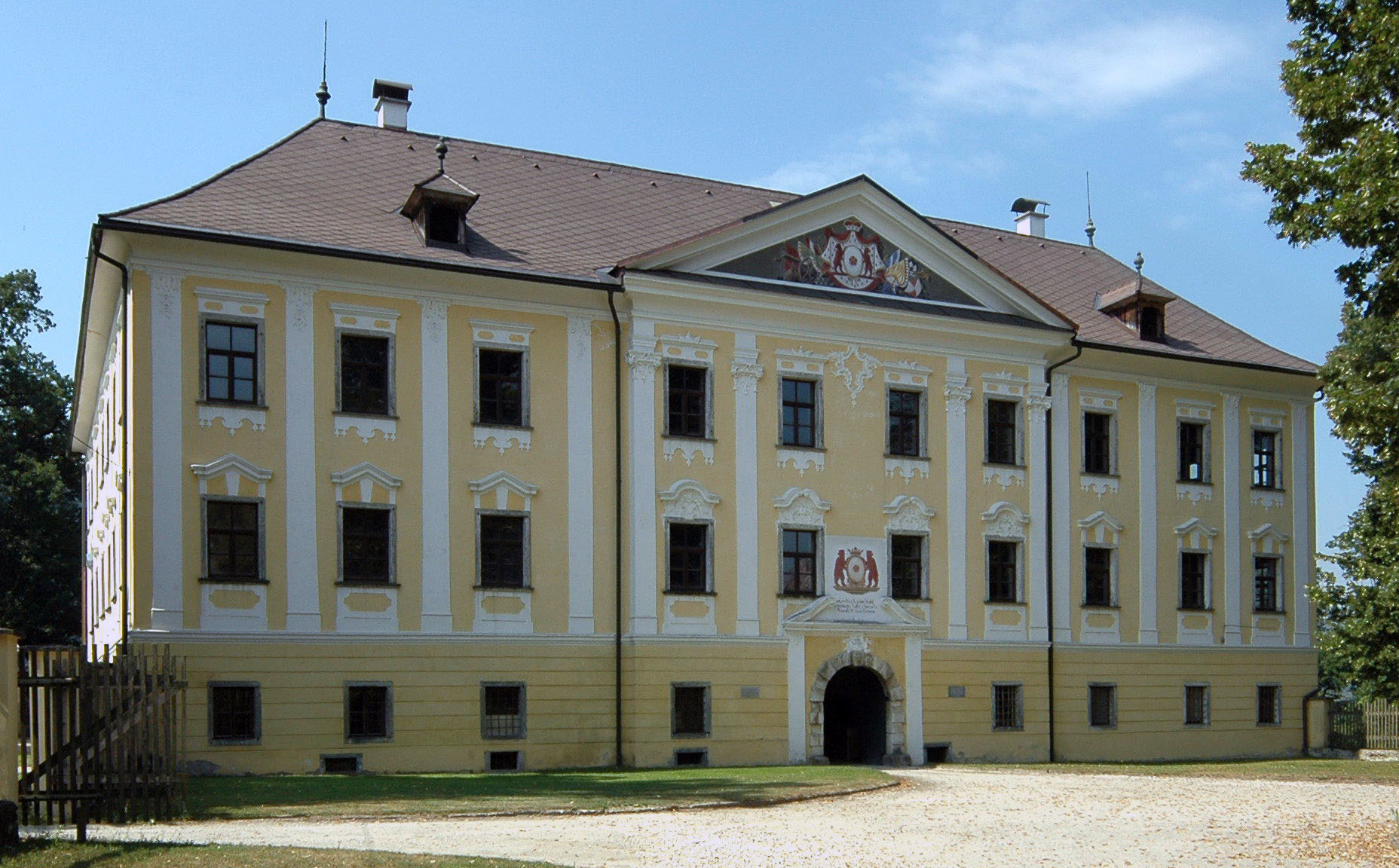
Grafenstein Castle (owned since 1638)

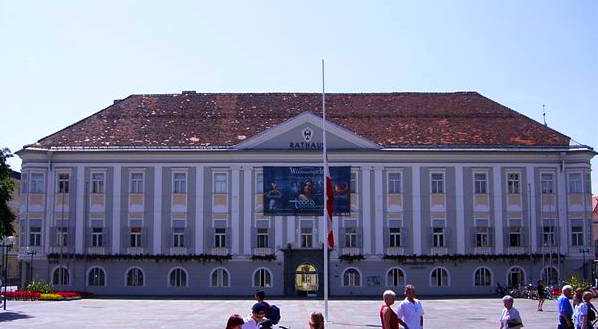
Klagenfurt Town Hall, formerly Palais Rosenberg (owned from 1650–1918)

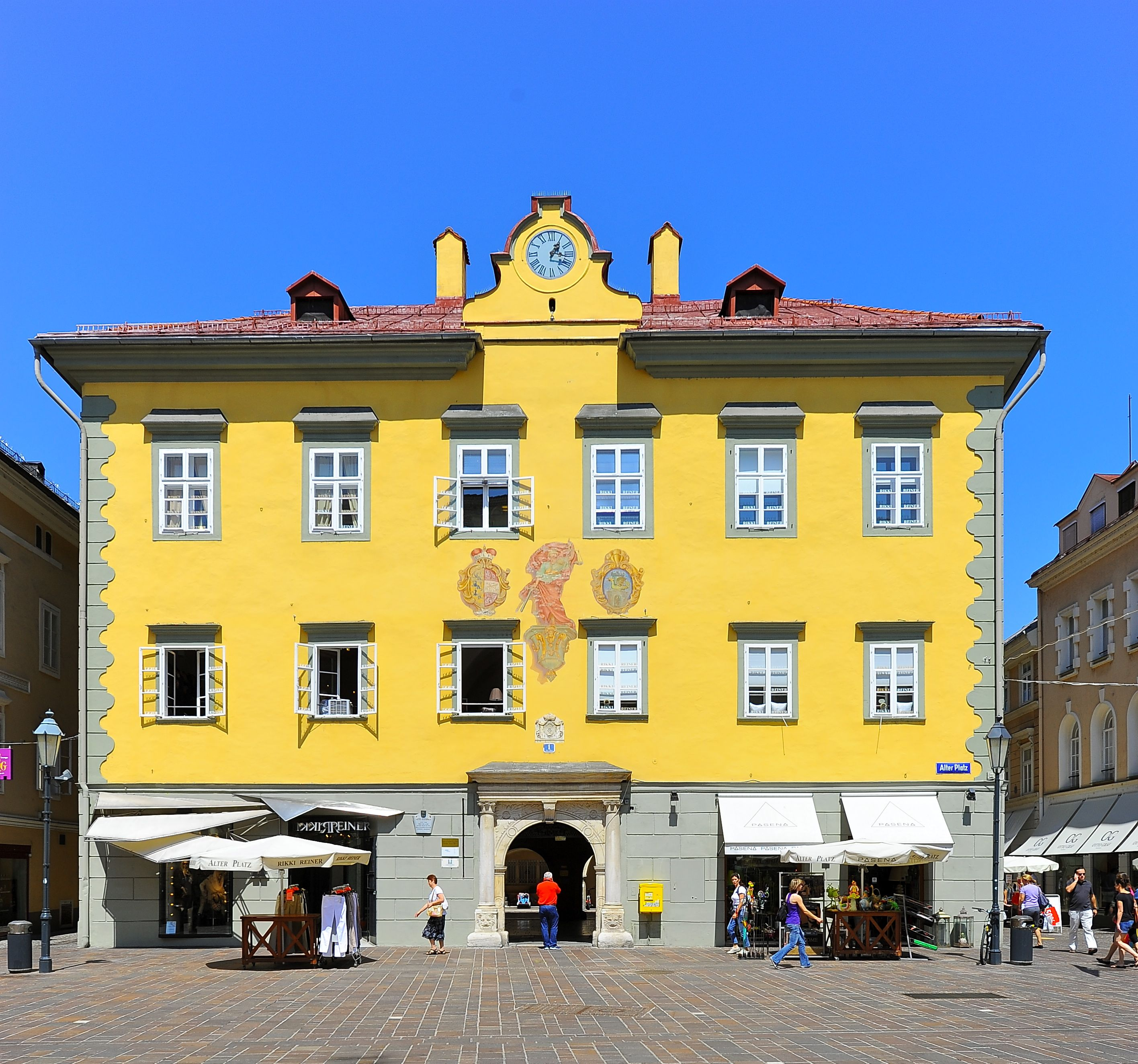
Old Town Hall (Klagenfurt am Wörthersee) in Klagenfurt (owned since 1918)

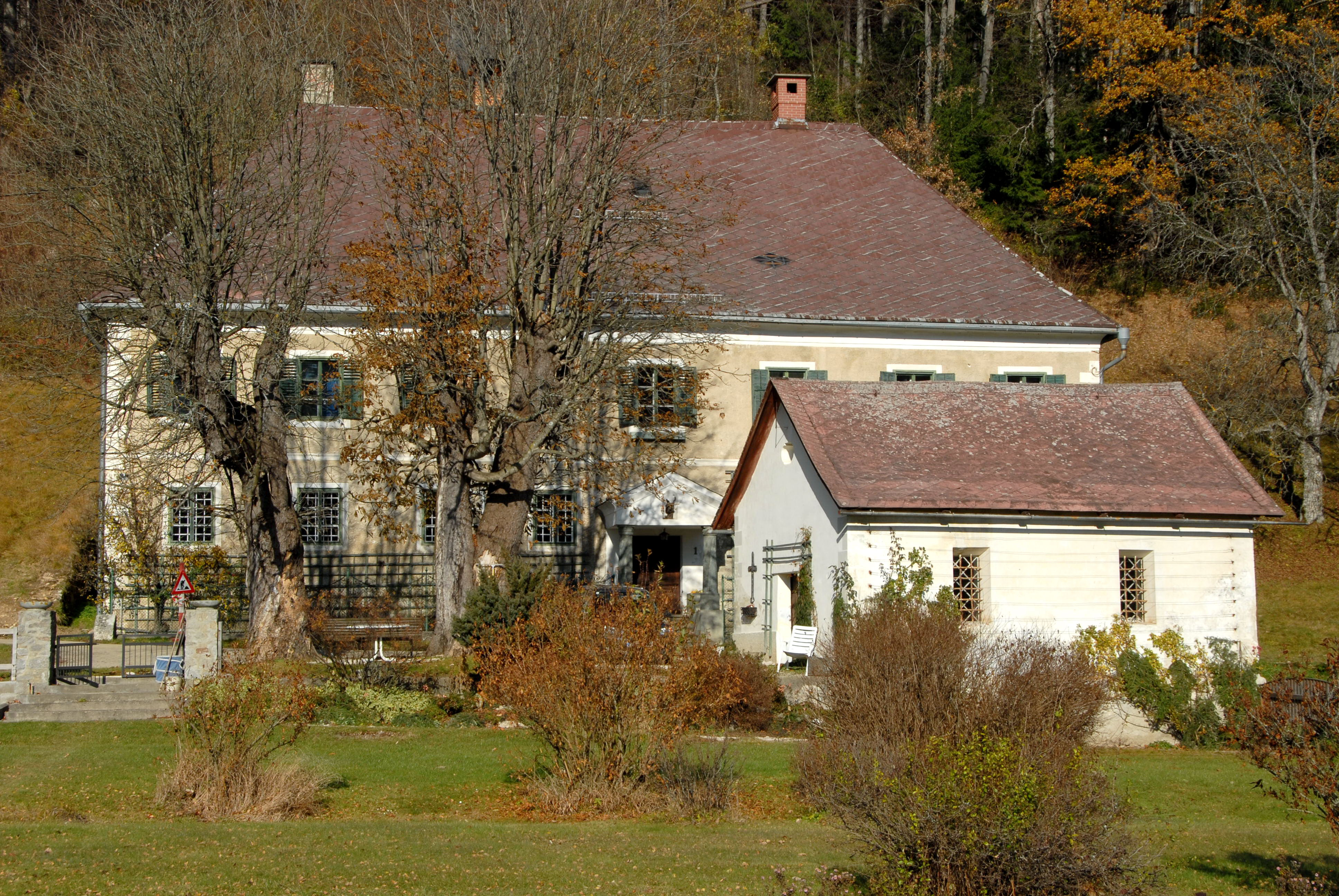
Sonnegg Castle (owned since 1636)

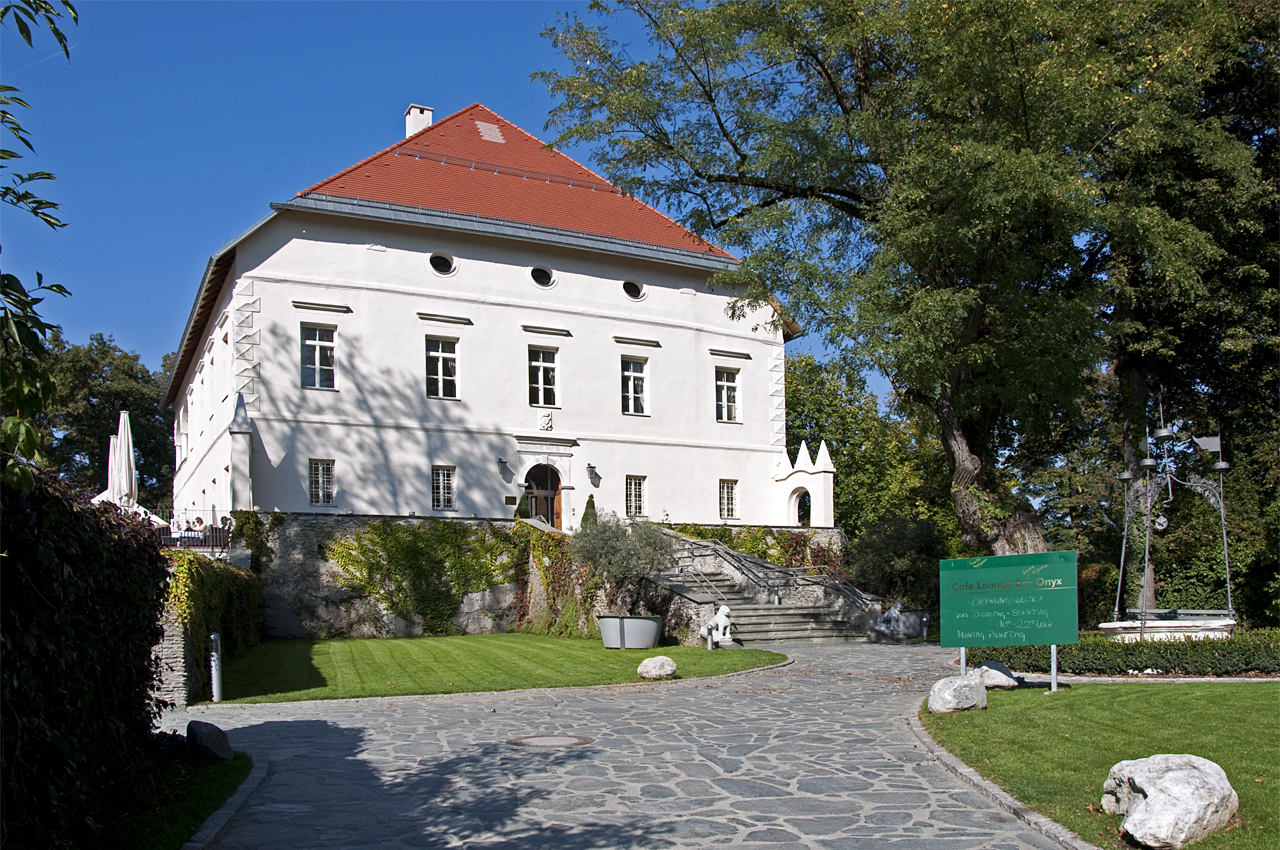
Maria-Loretto Castle on Lake Wörthersee (owned from 1654–2002)

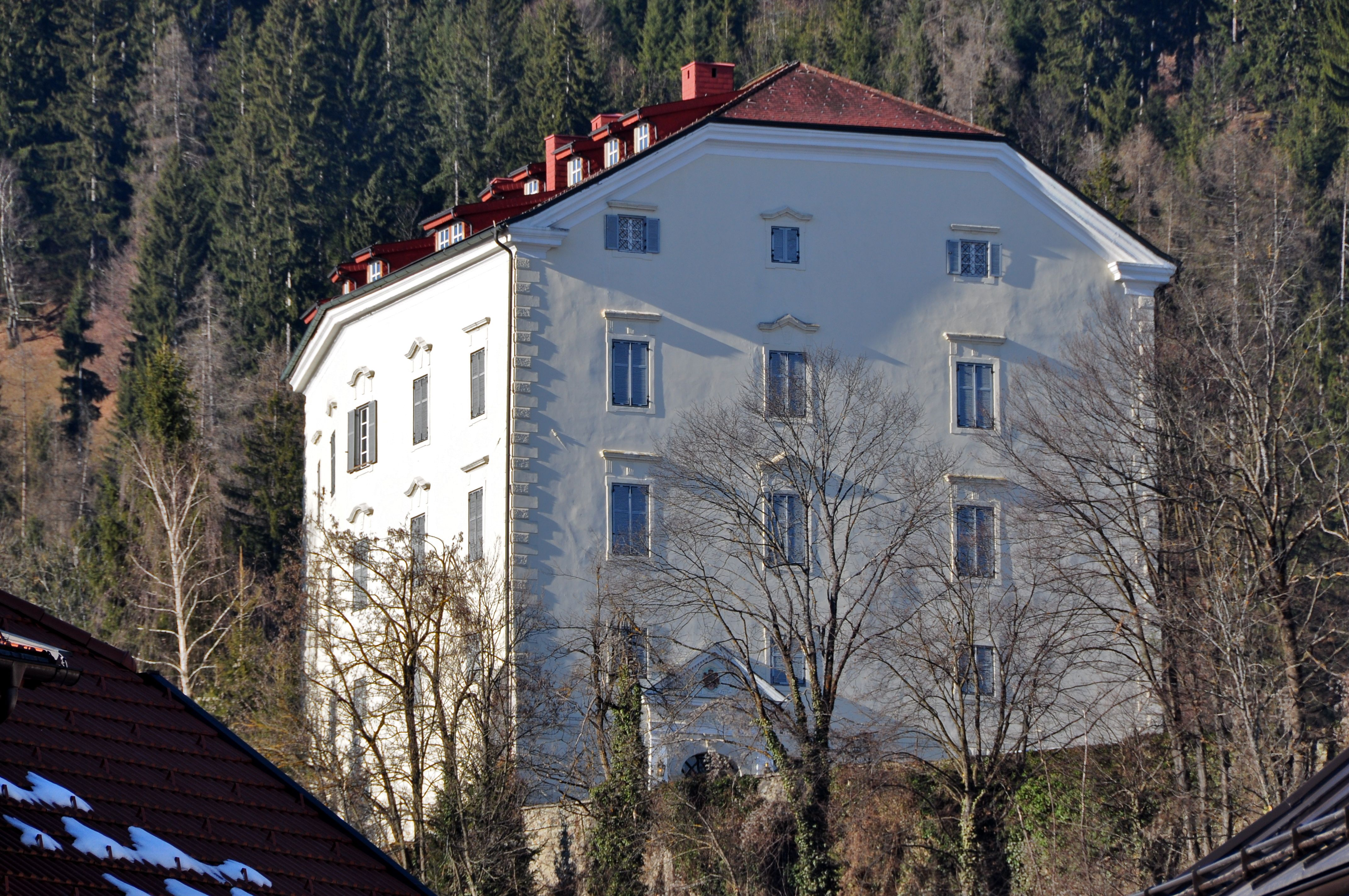
Greifenburg Castle (owned from 1676–1943)

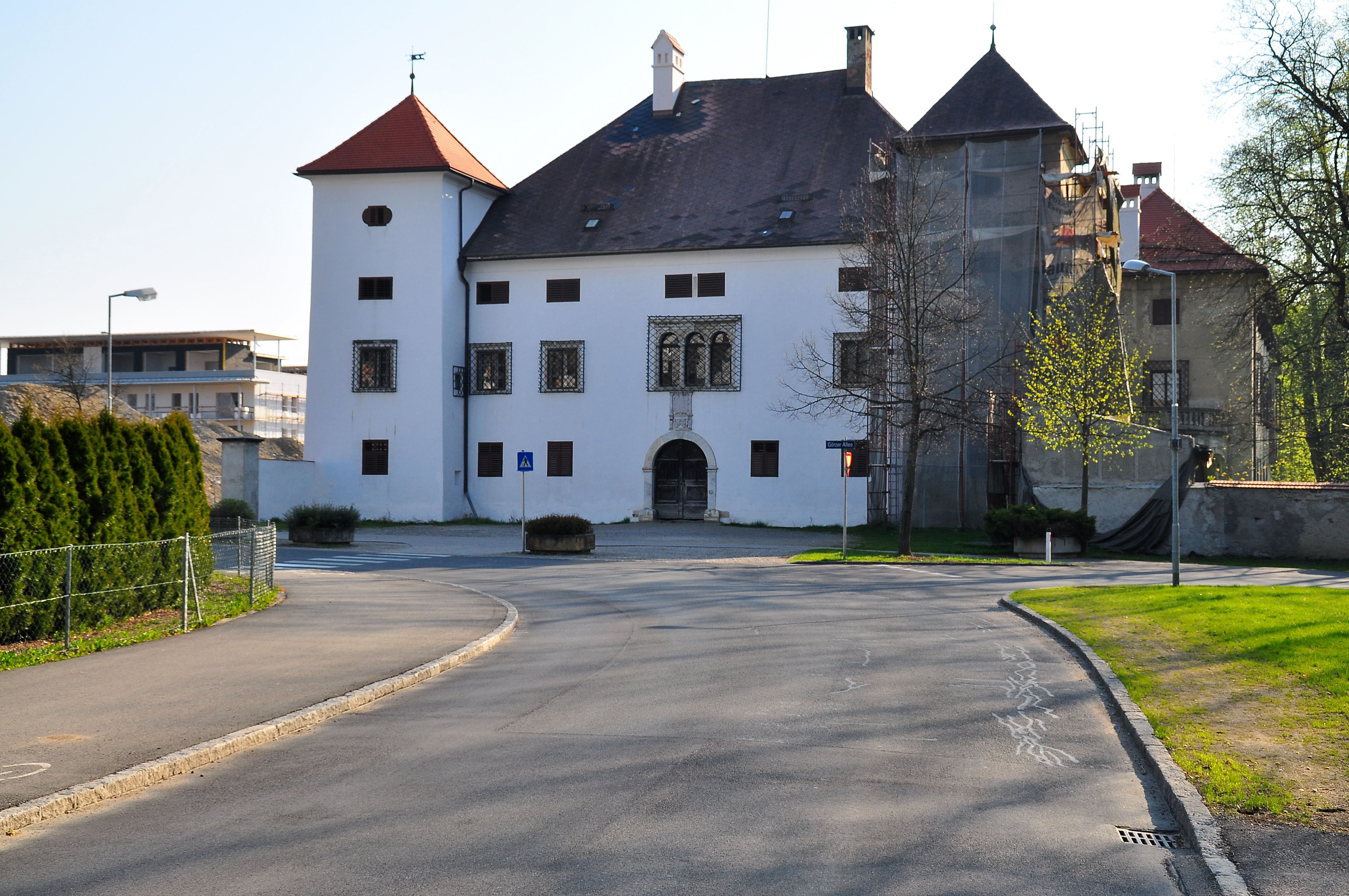
Schloss Welzenegg (owned from 1670–1983)

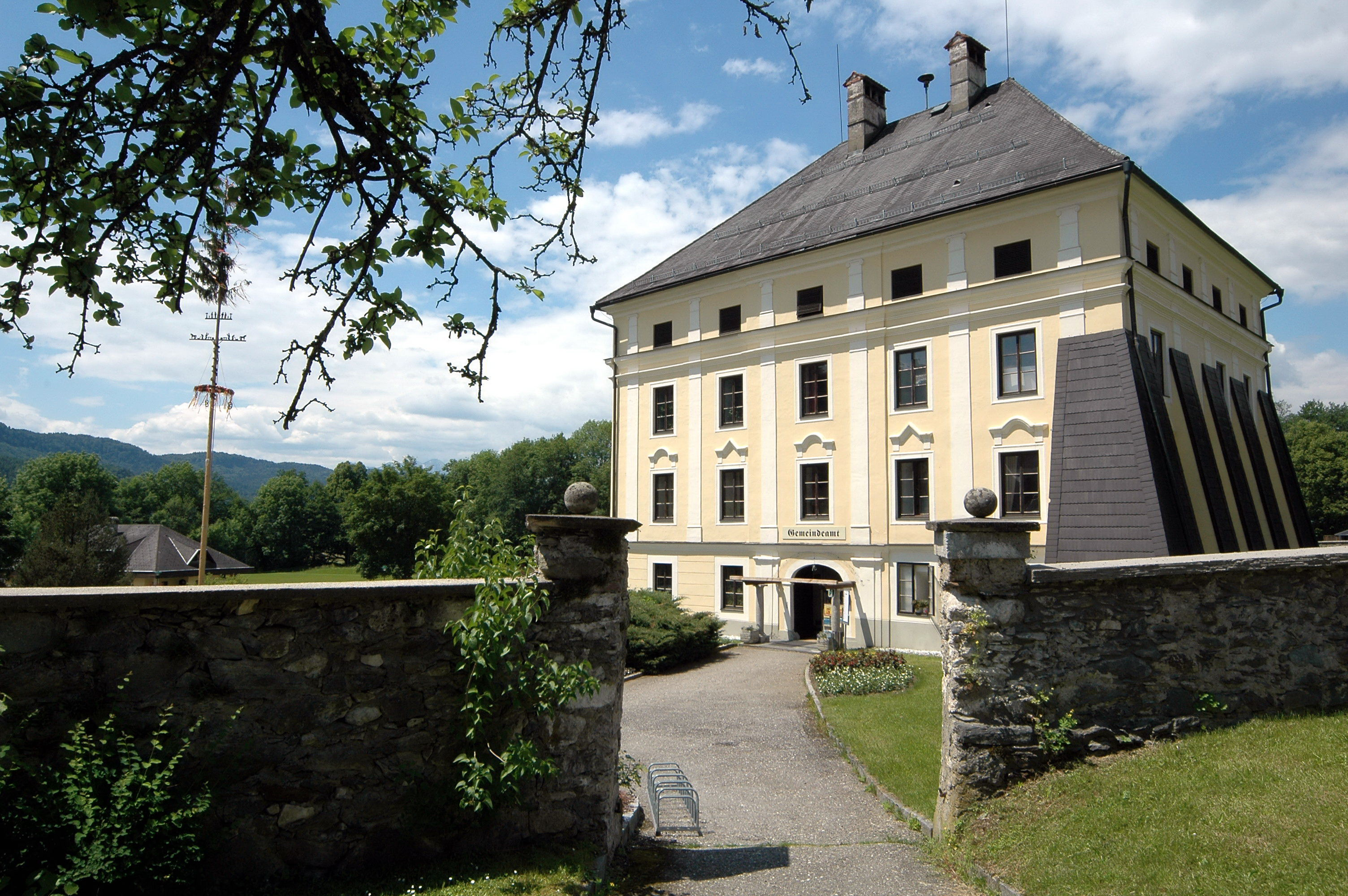
Keutschach am See Castle (owned from 1679–1926)

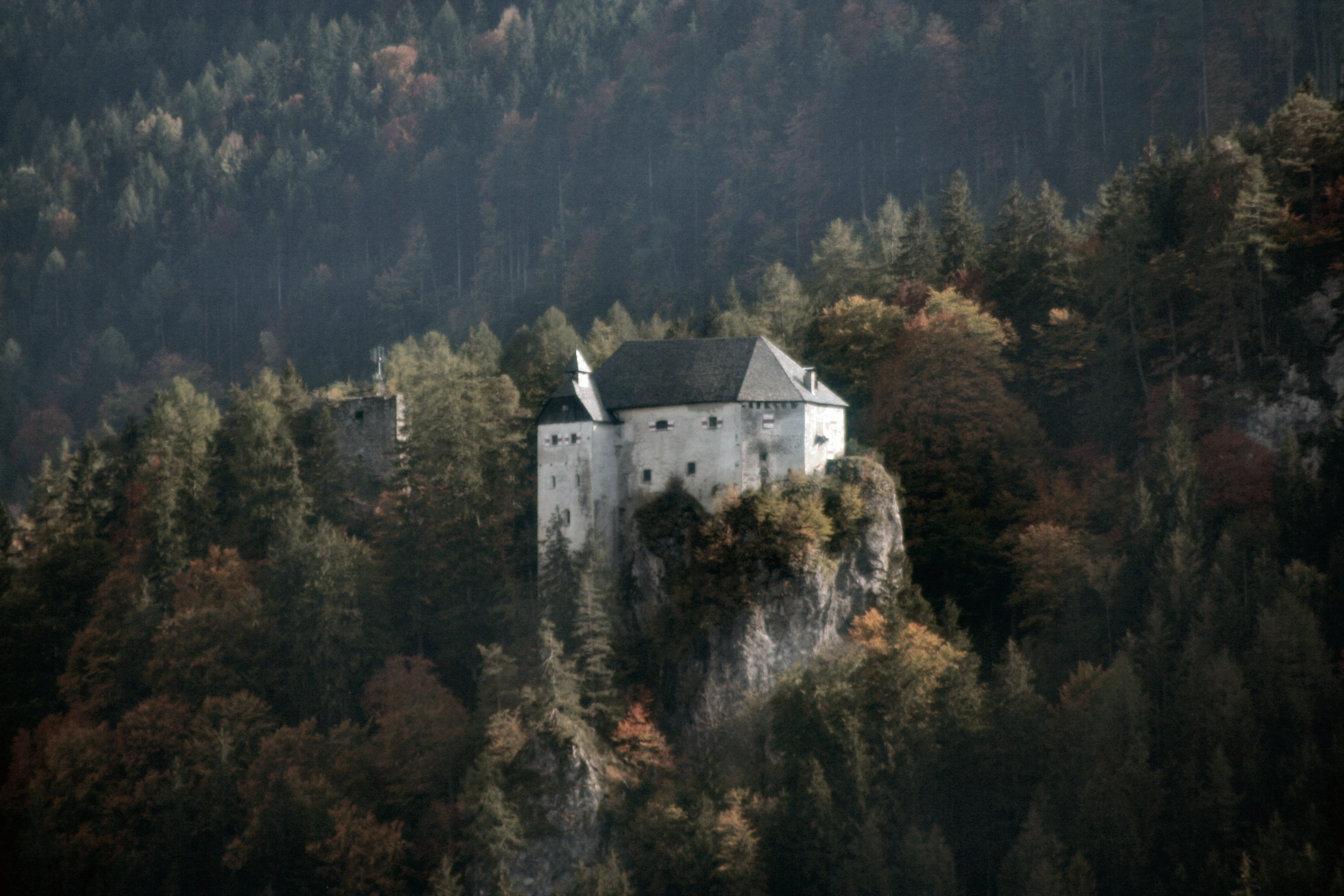
Stein Castle (Dellach im Drautal) (owned since 1681)

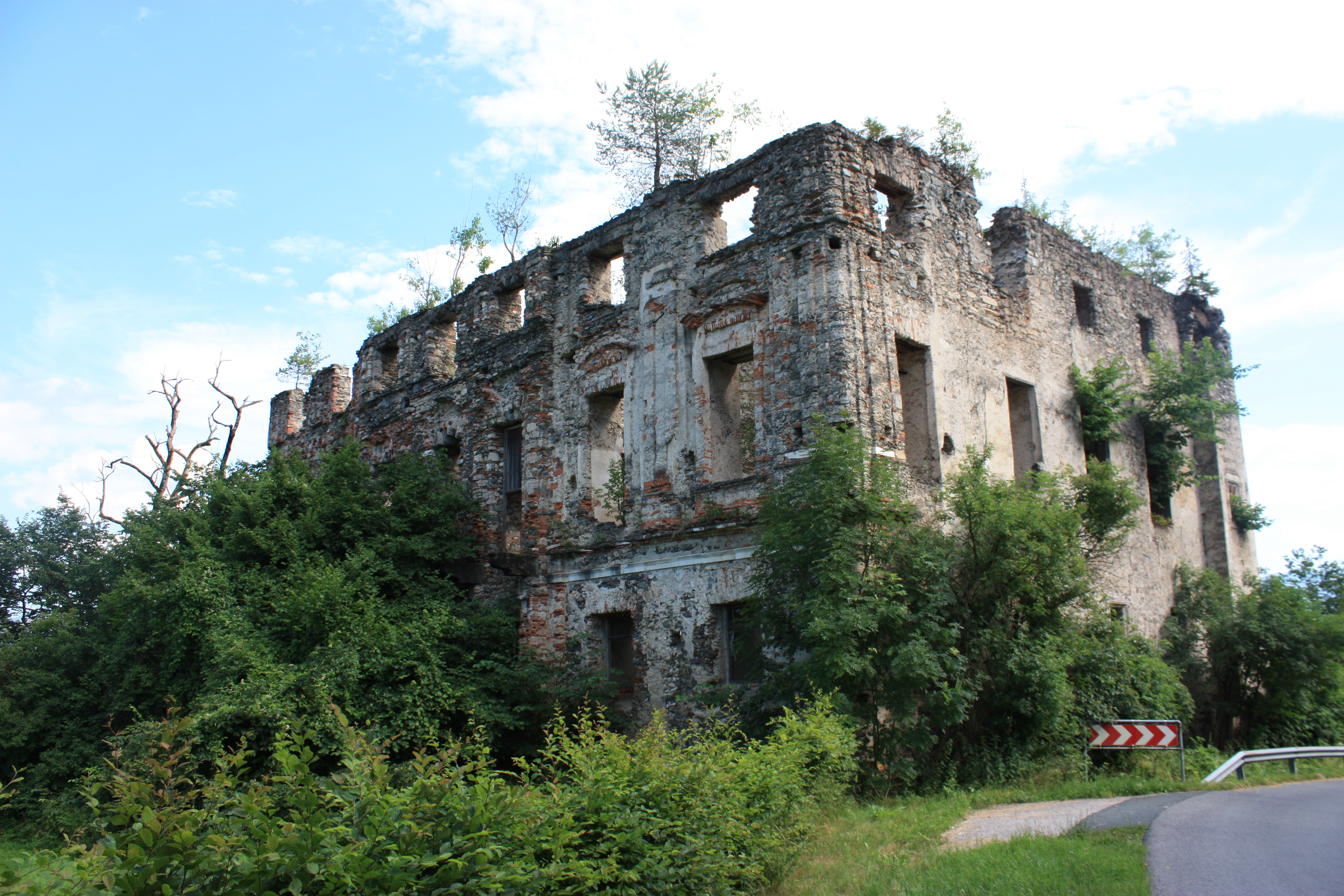
Höhenbergen Castle ruins near Völkermarkt (unfinished, owned since mid-18th century)

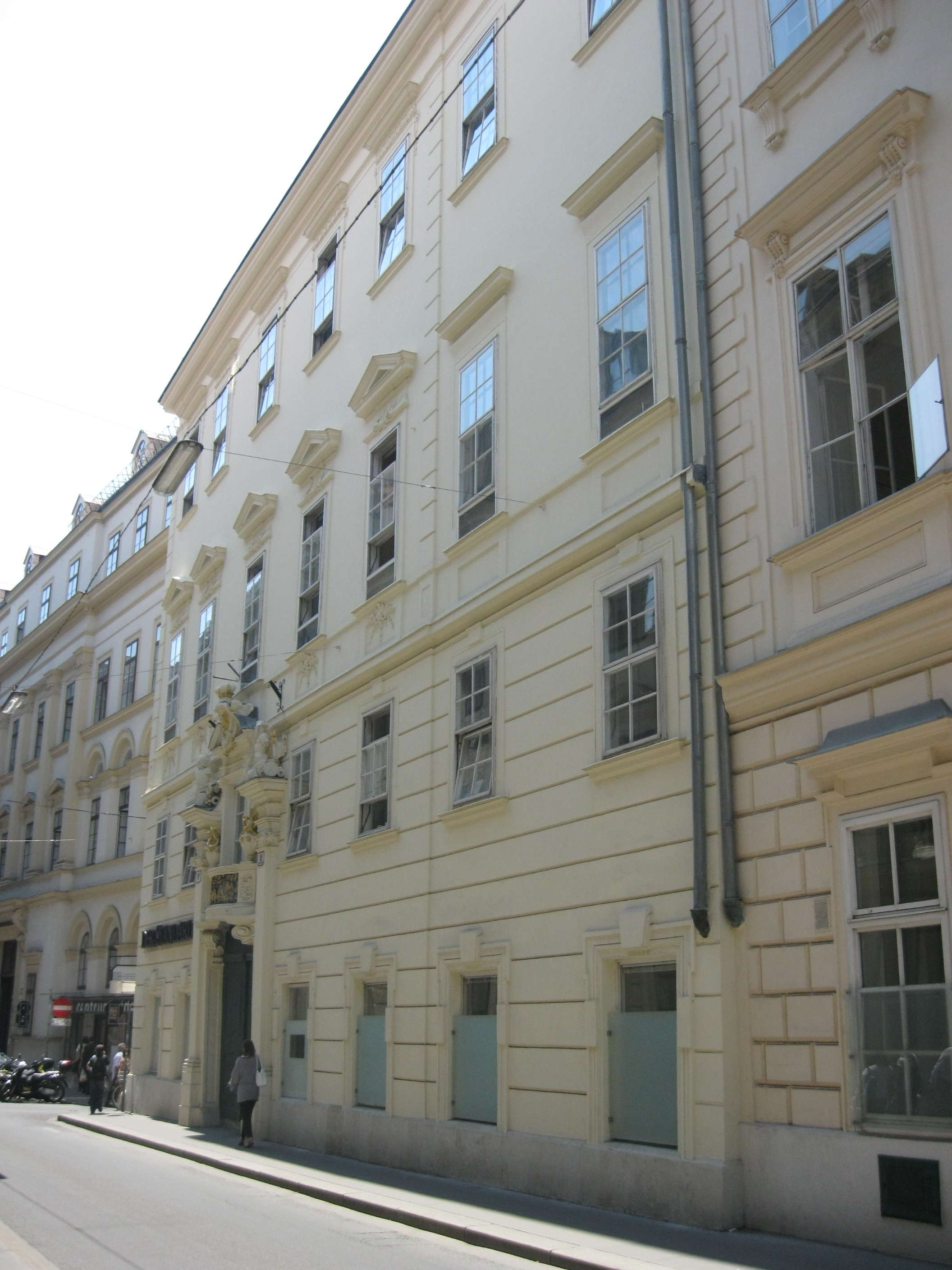
Former Palais Orsini-Rosenberg, Vienna

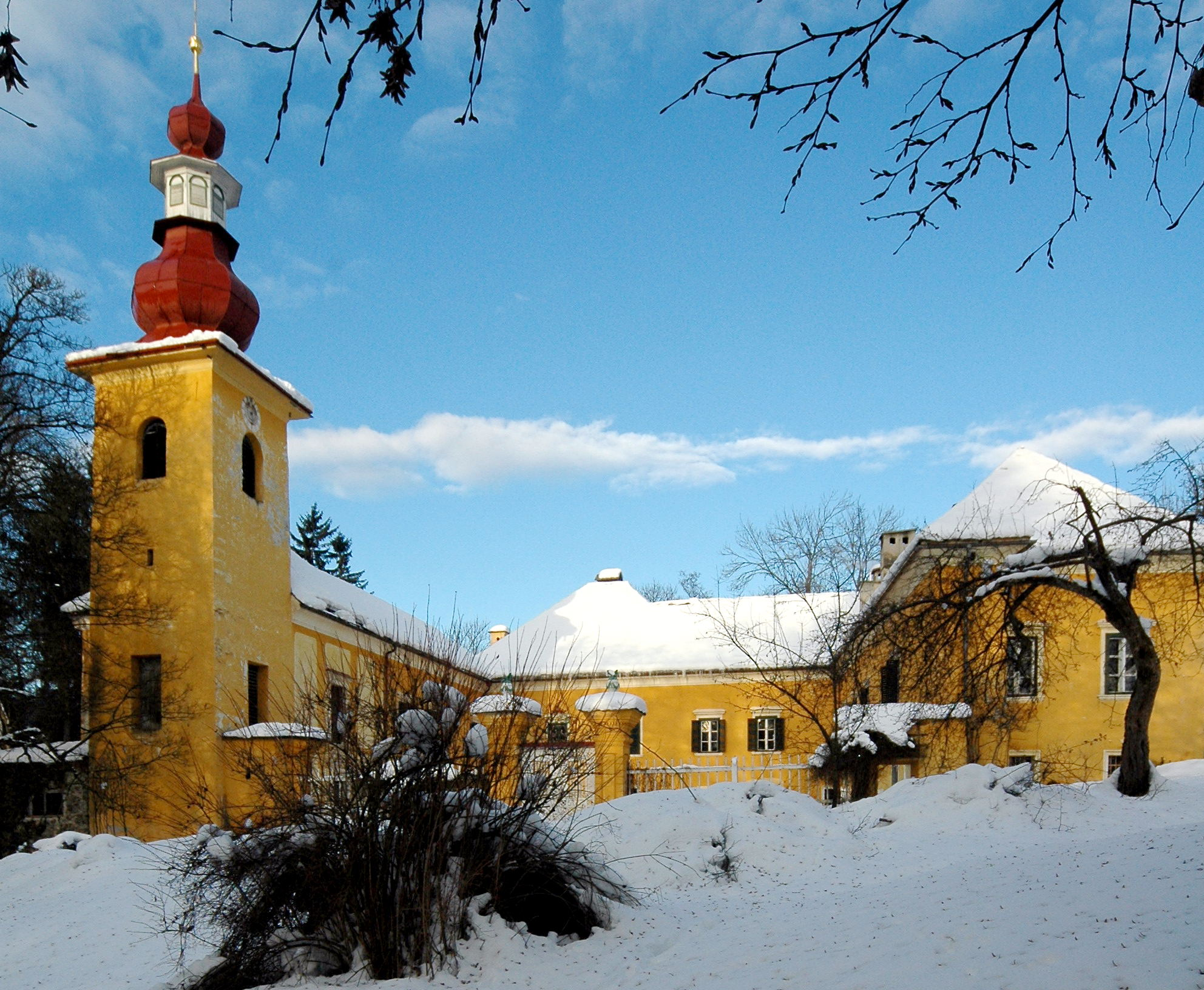
Damtschach Castle (owned since 1847)

== See also ==
- Orsini family (Italy)
- Rosenberg family (Bohemia)

== Literature ==
- Hans Pawlik: Orsini-Rosenberg, Geschichte und Genealogie eines alten Kärntner Adelsgeschlechts. In: Archiv für vaterländische Geschichte und Topographie. book nr. 98. Verlag des Geschichtsvereines für Kärnten, Klagenfurt 2009. p. 1-304.
