= Franz Seraph of Orsini-Rosenberg =

Austrian cavalry officer

Prince Franz Seraph von Orsini-Rosenberg
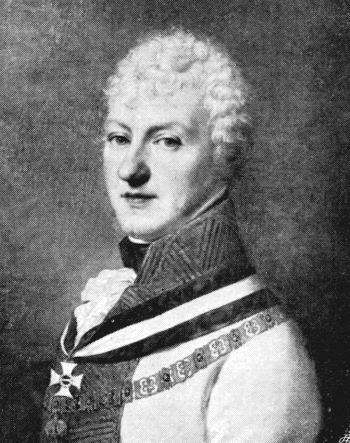
- Prince Franz Seraph of Orsini-Rosenberg
- Born: 18 October 1761; Graz, Austria
- Died: 4 August 1832 (aged 70); Vienna, Austria
- Relatives: House of Orsini-Rosenberg
- Military career
- Allegiance: Austrian Empire
- Branch: Cavalry
- Service years: 1780 – 1830
- Rank: General of Cavalry
- Conflicts: Austro-Turkish War (1787-1791); French Revolutionary Wars; Napoleonic Wars
- Awards: Military Order of Maria Theresa, KC 1790, CC 1801; Order of the Golden Fleece, 1808
- Other work: Inhaber Chevauxleger Regt. # 6; Privy Councillor, 1813

Prince Franz Seraph von Orsini-Rosenberg (18 October 1761 – 4 August 1832) was born a member of Orsini-Rosenberg family, son of Prince Vinzenz Fererius von Orsini-Rosenberg and Maria Juliana, Countess von Stubenberg.

He joined the army of Habsburg Austria and fought against the Ottoman Turks, winning a prestigious award for bravery. In the 1790s, he served in the wars against the French First Republic and received promotion to general officer. During the Napoleonic Wars he led a division in 1805 and an army corps in 1809. He became a member of the Hofkriegsrat (Aulic Council) in 1811. He was the Proprietor (Inhaber) of an Austrian light cavalry regiment from 1801 until his death.

== Wagram ==
At the Battle of Wagram, Rosenberg commanded the IV Armeekorps on the left flank.

== See also ==
- List of princes of Austria-Hungary
- Franz Xaver Wolfgang von Orsini-Rosenberg
- Orsini-Rosenberg
