= Katrin Saarsalu-Layachi =

Estonian diplomat

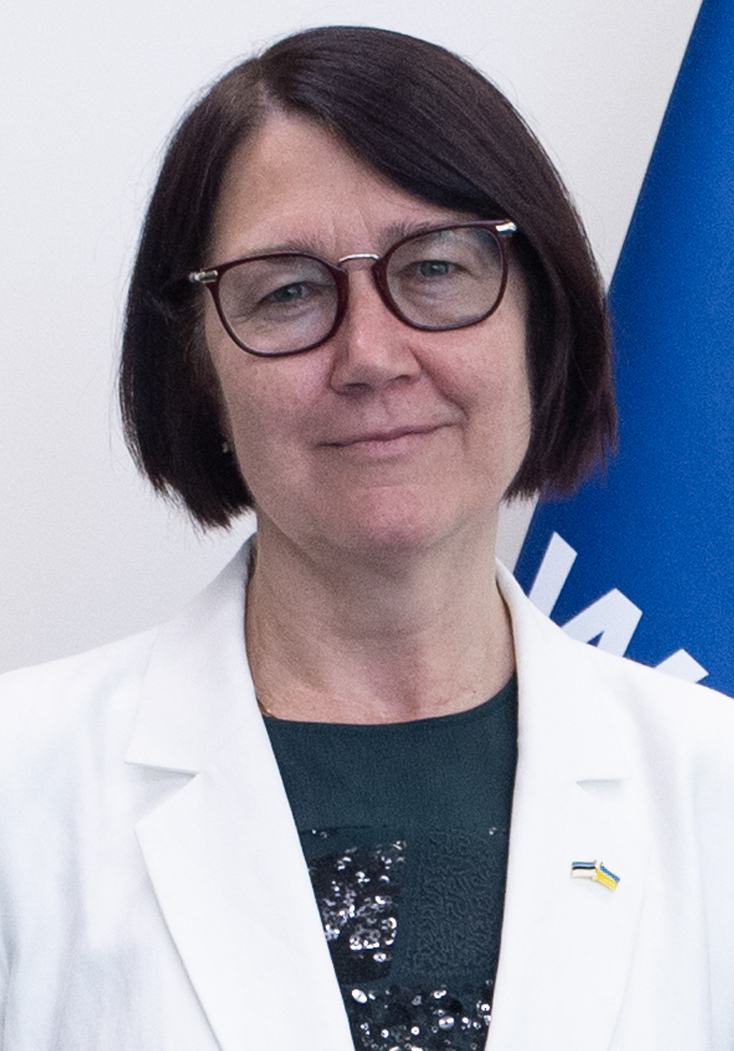
Katrin Saarsalu-Layachi in 2023

Katrin Saarsalu-Layachi (born 10 January 1967 in Tallinn) is an Estonian diplomat.

In 1990 she graduated from University of Tartu with a degree in law. Since 1991 she has worked at Estonian Foreign Ministry.

1996-1999 she was a counsellor at the Permanent Representation of Estonia to the European Union. 1999-2003 she was General Director of the Estonian Foreign Ministry's European Integration Department.

2003-2009 she was Ambassador of Estonia to Austria, Slovenia, Slovakia and Switzerland.

Awards:

- 2004: Order of the White Star, III class.
