= Jacqueline Maria Duarte Pires Ferreira Pires =

Cape Verdean diplomat

Jaqueline Maria Duarte Pires Ferreira Rodrigues Pires

Cape Verde Ambassador to Germany
- In office 2015–2019
- President: Jorge Carlos Fonseca
- Preceded by: Maria Cristina Rodrigues de Almeida Pereira
- Succeeded by: Theonilda Maria Silva

Personal details
- Born: November 1, 1968 (age 57)
- Education: Catholic University of Portugal

Jaqueline Maria Duarte Pires Ferreira Rodrigues Pires (born November 1, 1968) is a Cape Verdean diplomat. From 2015 to 2019, she was Ambassador to Germany.

She graduated from University of Lisbon, and Catholic University of Portugal. In 1995, she was embassy secretary. From 1998 to 2001 she worked as a consultant with the United Nations. In 2001, she became an advisor to the Cape Verdean Foreign Minister. From 2004 to 2009, she was an advisor to the Executive Secretary of the Community of Portuguese Language Countries. From 2010 to 2012, she was Deputy National Director for Political Affairs and Cooperation at the Cape Verdean Foreign Ministry. From 2012 to 2015, she was diplomatic advisor to the Prime Minister.
