= Margaret Jobson =

Jamaican diplomat

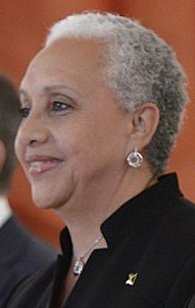
Margaret Jobson in 2014

Margaret Ann Louise Jobson (born 14 March 1955) is a Jamaican diplomat. She has served as a member of diplomatic staff and as ambassador of Jamaica to Germany, with dual accreditation to a number of European countries.

== Career ==
Jobson was born in Manchester Parish, Jamaica on 14 March 1955. She graduated from the University of the West Indies in 1977 and worked as a researcher at the Institute of Jamaica from 1977 to 1978. She then became administrator of the Language Training Centre at the Ministry of Public Service from 1978 until 1980, and then an office manager at Language Today Limited from 1980 to 1981. In 1982 she was appointed assistant to the regional adviser for education and development, and then regional adviser for Sciences and Technologies of the Caribbean Office of UNESCO until 1985. In 1985 she became an administrative assistant at the United Nations Development Programme (UNDP), and in 1986 became senior program assistant there. In 1989 Jobson was given responsibility for the Program and Projects Management Department at the United Nations Development Programme, which she held until 1994. In 1995 she became National Program Officer for Jamaica and the Turks and Caicos Islands for the UNDP and in 1996 she was Agency Coordinator of the Public Sector Modernization Project. She was in this post until 2003, during which time she graduated from her alma mater, the University of the West Indies, with a master's degree in Human Resources Development in 2000. In 2003 she became Undersecretary at the Ministry of Foreign Affairs and Foreign Trade, and in November 2013 was appointed ambassador of Jamaica to Germany.

The ambassador of Jamaica to Germany is resident in Berlin and is concurrently accredited as the non-resident ambassador to Bulgaria, Czech Republic, Holy See, Hungary, Israel, Poland, Romania, Russia, Serbia, Slovakia and Ukraine. On 20 November 2013 she presented letters of accreditation to President of Germany Joachim Gauck at the Bellevue Palace.

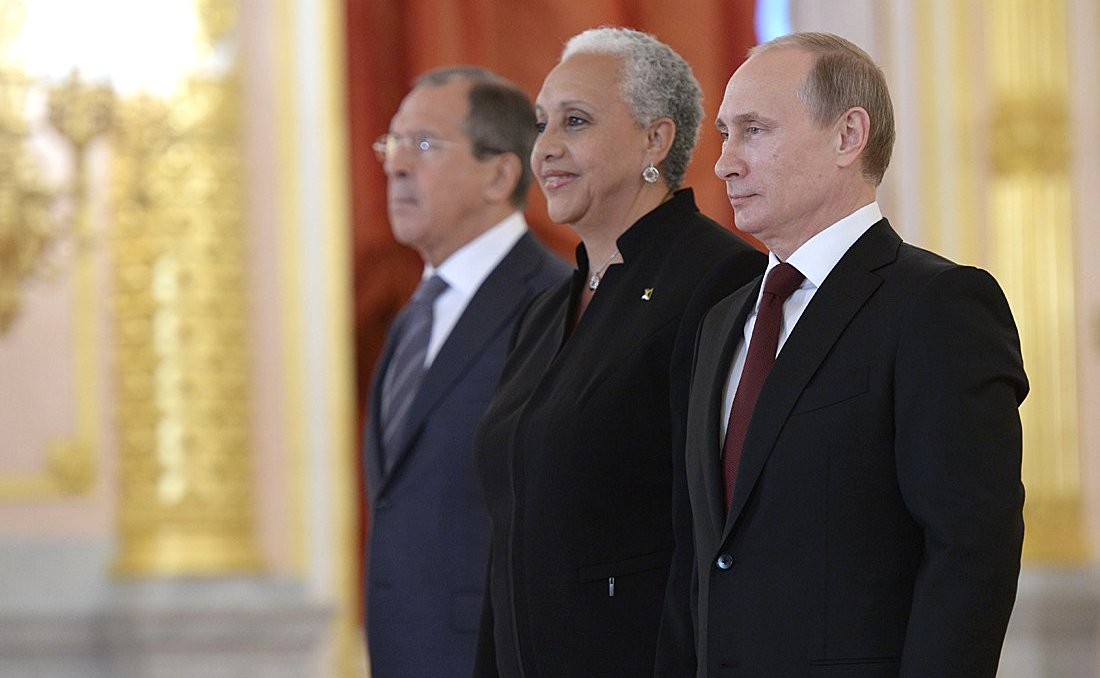
With President of Russia Vladimir Putin and Foreign Affairs Minister Sergey Lavrov in 2014

Over the next two years she visited the countries she is also accredited to, to formally present her credentials. On 15 May 2014 she presented letters of accreditation to Pope Francis at the Vatican, and 27 June 2014 she presented letters of accreditation to President of Russia Vladimir Putin in the Kremlin, Moscow. On 1 September 2014 she presented letters of accreditation to Romanian Secretary of State Radu Podgorean and on 2 September 2014 to President of Romania Traian Băsescu. On 20 May 2015 Jobson presented letters of accreditation to the Czech Republic in Prague, and on 8 September 2016 she was in Kyiv to present her accreditation to President of Ukraine Petro Poroshenko.

Jobson is married, with a son. She speaks English and Spanish.
