= Doris Frick =

Liechtenstein diplomat (born 1963)

Her Excellency Doris Frick
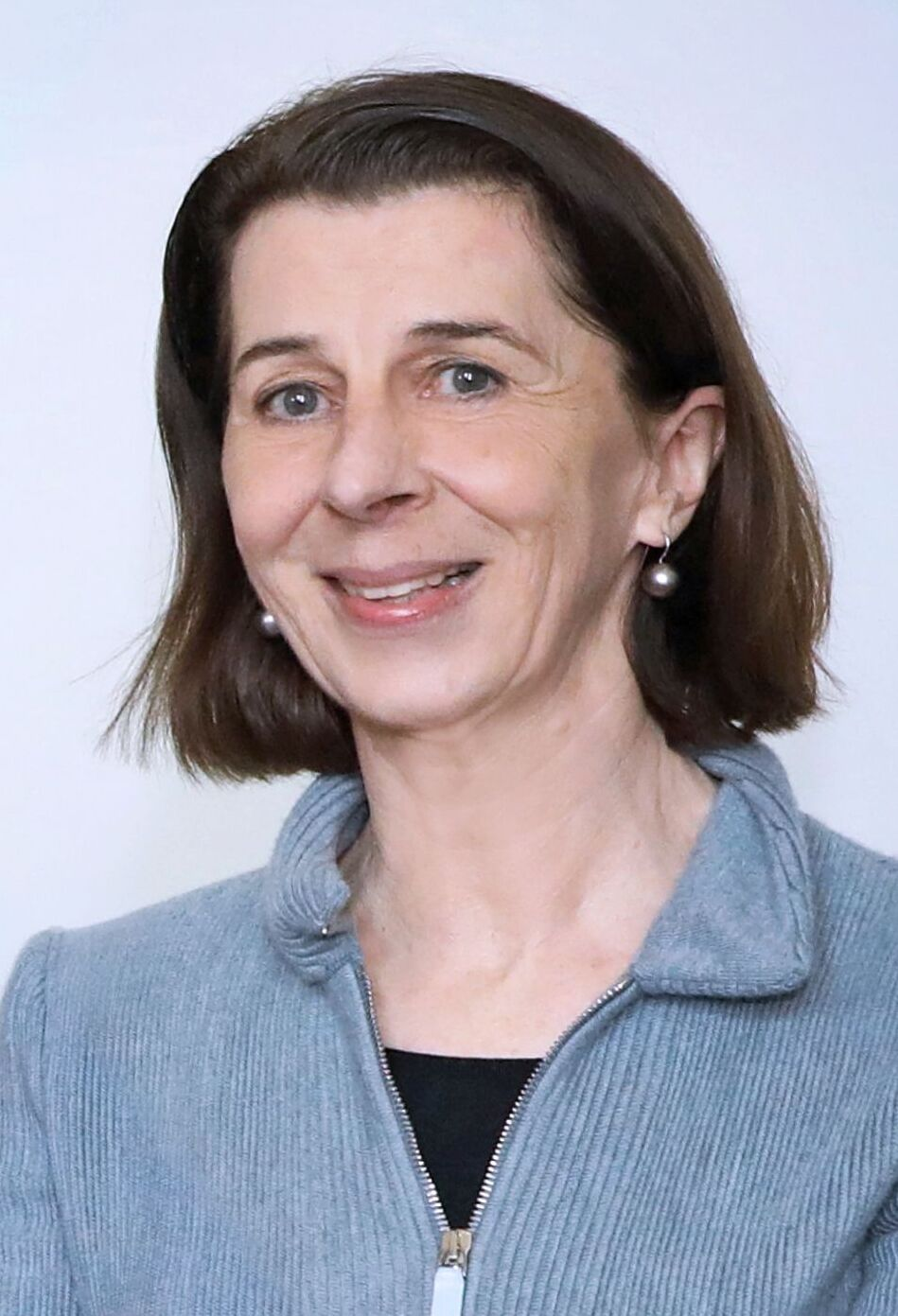
- Frick in 2023

Liechtenstein Ambassador to Switzerland
- Incumbent
- Assumed office 26 March 2013
- Monarchs: Hans-Adam II; Alois (regent)
- Preceded by: Hubert Büchel

Personal details
- Born: 28 November 1963 (age 62) Schaan, Liechtenstein
- Party: Patriotic Union

Doris Frick (born 28 November 1963) is a diplomat from Liechtenstein who has served as the ambassador to Switzerland since 2013.

== Life ==
Frick was born in Schaan. She studied economics at the University of St. Gallen, and then completed a doctorate with a thesis on the subject of freedom of capital and services in the European Economic Area. She joined the Liechtenstein diplomatic service in 1993.

From 1997 to 2013 she was deputy ambassador in both the Liechtenstein embassy in Bern and consulate in Geneva. In 2013 she replaced the retiring Hubert Büchel as Liechtenstein's ambassador to Switzerland.

She was a member of the Balzers municipal council from 2007 to 2010 as a member of the Patriotic Union.
