= Rosegg =

Rosegg Rožek
- Municipality
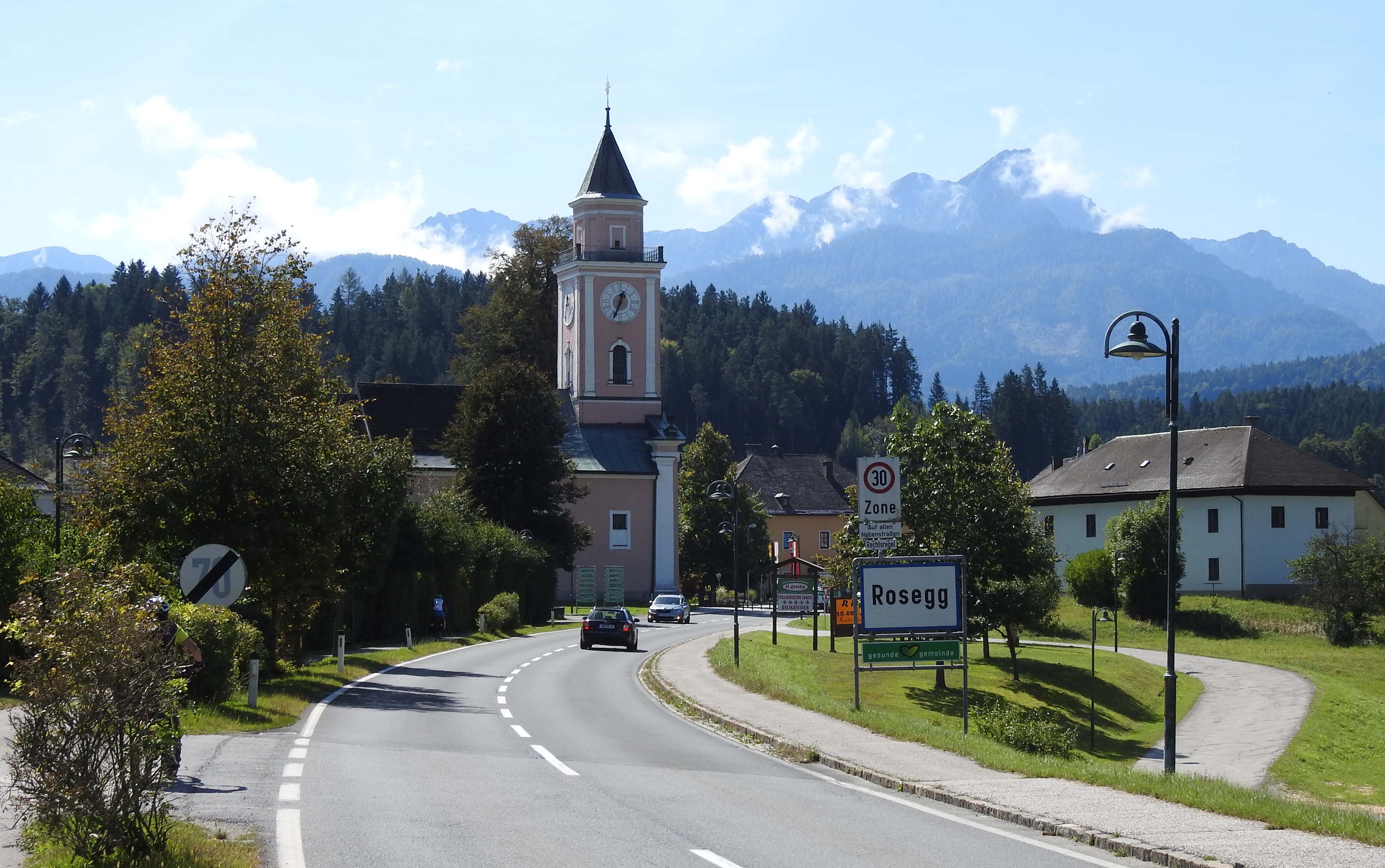
- Rosegg from north

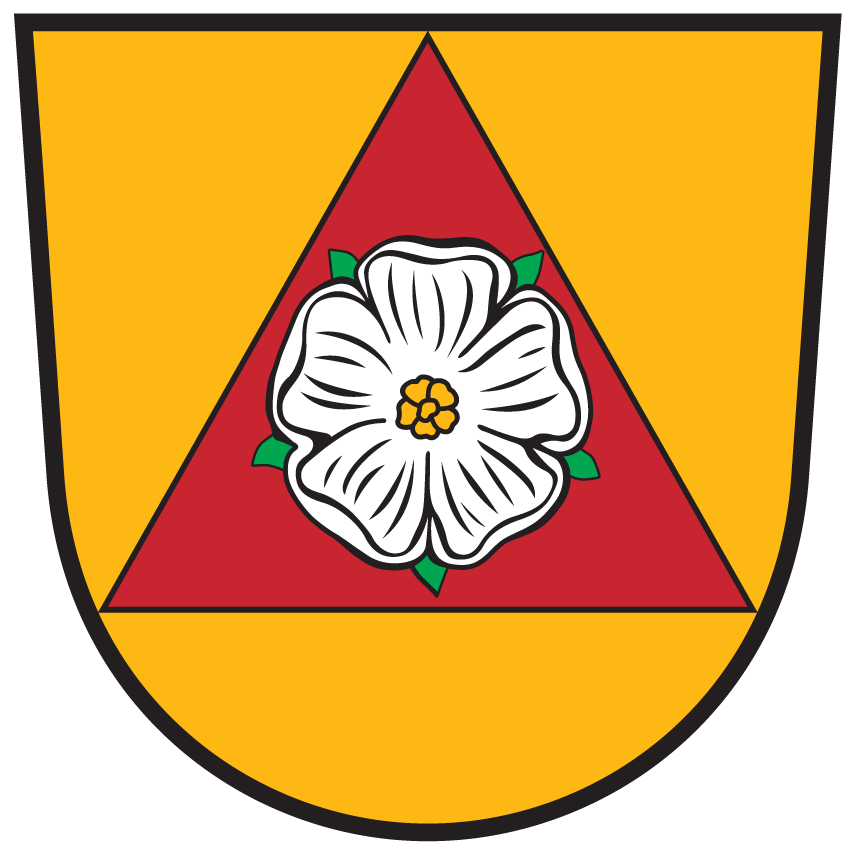
- Coat of arms

- Location within Austria
- Coordinates: 46°34′N 14°1′E
- Country: Austria
- State: Carinthia
- District: Villach-Land

Government
  - Mayor: Franz Richau

Area
  - Total: 19.17 km^{2} (7.40 sq mi)
- Elevation: 477 m (1,565 ft)

Population (2018-01-01)
  - Total: 1,832
  - Density: 95.57/km^{2} (247.5/sq mi)
- Time zone: UTC+1 (CET)
  - Summer (DST): UTC+2 (CEST)
- Postal code: 9232
- Area code: 04253, 04274
- Website: www.roseggonline.at

Rosegg (Slovene: Rožek) is a municipality in the district of Villach-Land in Carinthia in Austria.

== Geography ==
Rosegg consists of three catastral municipalities (Katastralgemeinden) (Population as of 2025):

- Berg (490)
- Emmersdorf (562)
- Rosegg (858)

Rosegg can be further divided into 18 localities (Ortschaften) (Population as of 2025):

- Berg (Gora) (66)
- Bergl (Gora) (166)
- Buchheim (Podhum) (83)
- Dolintschach (Dolinčiče) (34)
- Drau (Na dravi) (92)
- Duel (Dole) (81)
- Emmersdorf (Tmara vas) (120)
- Frög (Breg) (130)
- Frojach (Broje) (5)
- Kleinberg (Mala gora) (45)
- Obergoritschach (Zgornje Goriče) (50)
- Pirk (Brezje) (83)
- Raun (Ravne) (58)
- Rosegg (Rožek) (461)
- St. Johann (Ščedem) (18)
- St. Lamprecht (Semislavče) (184)
- St. Martin (Šmartin) (136)
- Untergoritschach (Spodnje Goriče) (98)

=== Neighboring municipalities ===
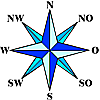
| Wernberg | Velden am Wörthersee |
| Villach |
| Finkenstein am Faaker See | Sankt Jakob im Rosental |

== Personalities ==
It is the birthplace of the painter Peter Markovič, after whom the local Slovene cultural association is named. Liechtenstein's Former Ambassador to Germany, Prince Stefan of Liechtenstein, grew up in Rosegg.

== Politics ==
The municipal assembly (Gemeinderat) consists of 15 members. Since the 2021 local elections, it is made up of the following parties:

- Independent Bürgergemeinschaft (BGM): 8 seats
- Social Democratic Party of Austria (SPÖ): 5 seats
- Freedom Party of Austria (FPÖ): 1 seat
- The Greens - The Green Alternative (GRÜNE): 1 seat

The mayor of the municipality, Franz Richau, was re-elected in 2021.

== Twin towns ==
- Bohinj, Slovenia
- Lauco, Italy
- Osoppo, Italy
- Zuglio, Italy
