= Prince Karl Aloys of Liechtenstein =

Austrian Rittmeister and Governor of Liechtenstein from 1918 to 1920

Prince Karl Aloys
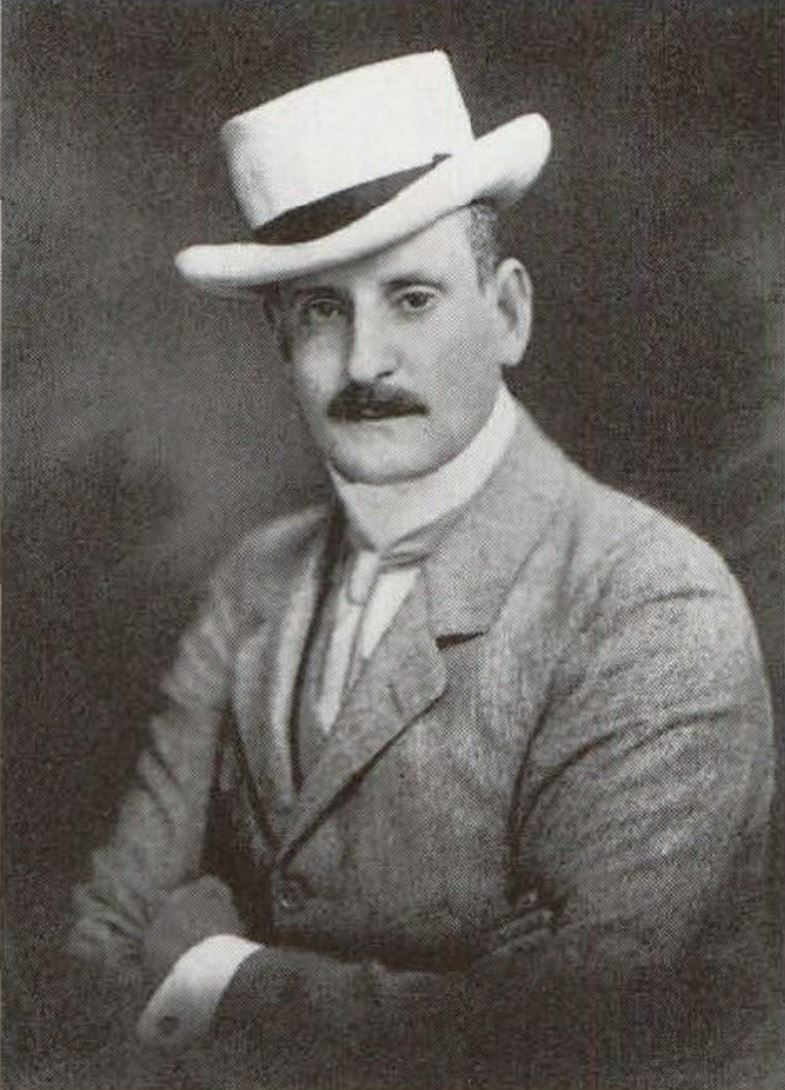
- Born: 16 September 1878; Frauenthal Castle, Austria-Hungary
- Died: 20 June 1955 (aged 76); Frauenthal Castle, Austria
- Burial: St. Florian Cathedral, Vaduz, Liechtenstein
- Spouse: Elizabeth, Princess of Urach and Countess of Württemberg (m. 1921)
- Issue: Prince Wilhelm Alfred; Princess Maria Josepha; Princess Franziska; Prince Wolfgang
Names
- Karl Aloys
- House: Liechtenstein
- Father: Prince Alfred of Liechtenstein
- Mother: Princess Henriette of Liechtenstein

Governor of Liechtenstein
- In office 13 December 1918 – 15 September 1920
- Monarch: Johann II
- Preceded by: Martin Ritter (Chairman of the Provisional Executive Committee)
- Succeeded by: Josef Peer

Military service
- Allegiance: Austria-Hungary
- Branch/service: Austro-Hungarian Army
- Years of service: Unknown–1918
- Rank: Rittmaster
- Wars: World War I

Prince Karl Aloys von Liechtenstein (16 September 1878 – 20 June 1955) was an Imperial and Royal cavalry master until the fall of the monarchy in Austria-Hungary in 1918, and from 1918 to 1920 he was the Governor of Liechtenstein.

He was the fifth son of Prince Alfred of Liechtenstein and Princess Henriette of Liechtenstein and uncle of Franz Joseph II.

== Early career ==
Karl attended the Schottengymnasium and studied law in Vienna. He worked in the Austrian civil service, and was captain regent of the Mistelbach District.

During World War I, he was an Imperial and Royal Cavalry Master (Rittmeister) in the Austro-Hungarian Army. He was seriously wounded during the war, yet continued to serve until the end of the monarchy in Austria-Hungary.

== Governor of Liechtenstein ==
Following the November 1918 Liechtenstein putsch, Karl arrived in Vaduz to act as a mediator between the different parties. It was agreed that the Provisional Executive Committee, formed following the putsch would last one month when a replacement cabinet could be found. On 7 December 1918 it was dissolved and Karl was appointed as Governor of Liechtenstein by Johann II upon the recommendation of the Landtag of Liechtenstein on 13 December.

In this position, Karl appealed to Switzerland in order to begin recovery from the economic devastation World War I brought to the country. As such, Switzerland continued food deliveries to Liechtenstein from 1919 onwards. In addition, he appealed to Felix Calonder to begin negotiations between the two countries for the eventual establishment of a customs union. On 2 August 1919, Liechtenstein disestablished the customs union with Austria and then in October 1919, on its request, Switzerland agreed to represent Liechtenstein's interests abroad where it did not already have representation.

During his time as governor he attempted to mediate relations between the Progressive Citizens' Party and Christian Social People's Party regarding the creation of a new constitution, which had been in popular demand since the 1918 putsch. He created a draft constitution in April 1920, which made minimal changes to the existing 1862 Constitution of Liechtenstein and it was rejected by the Landtag. Instead, the draft constitution presented by Wilhelm Beck was accepted which limited the power of the prince of Liechtenstein for a constitutional monarchy on a democratic and parliamentary basis, of which were loosely based on the Swiss Federal Constitution.

On 15 September 1920, he was succeeded as Governor by Josef Peer. He signed the constitution of Liechtenstein on behalf of Johann II alongside Josef Ospelt as a government representative on 5 October 1921.

== Marriage and family ==
Prince Karl was a son of Prince Alfred of Liechtenstein and Princess Henriette. He married on 31 March 1921 at the civil registry in Stuttgart Elizabeth, Princess of Urach and Countess of Württemberg. The church wedding was celebrated on 5. April 1921 in Tegernsee.

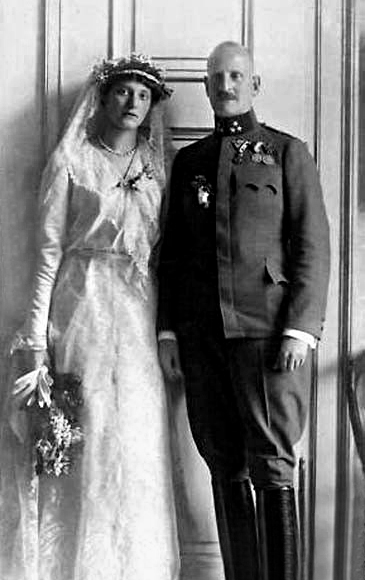
Wedding of Prince Karl Aloys of Liechtenstein and Elisabeth, Duchess of Urach and Countess of Württemberg

They had four children:

- Prince Wilhelm Alfred Heinrich Karl Theodor Otto Gero Maria Joseph (Frauenthal, 29 May 1922 - Vienna, 27 November 2006), who renounced his title on 11 July 1950 and took the title of Graf von Hohenau (not to be confused with Wilhelm Graf von Hohenau). He was restored to his titles on 28 October 1980. He married in Kitzbühel civilly on 19 August 1950 and religiously on 21 August 1950 Emma von Gutmannsthal-Benvenuti (Rain bei Klagenfurt, 14 May 1926 - Vienna, 31 August 1984), daughter of Felix Georg von Gutmannsthal-Benvenuti and wife Hermine Krum, and had issue:
  - Prince Felix Karl Wilhelm Otto Leopold Maria Graf von Hohenau (b. Graz, 22 May 1951), unmarried and without issue
  - Prince Benedikt Ulrich Edmund Vinzenz Josef Maria Graf von Hohenau (Vienna, 22 January 1953 - 29 September 2019), married in Vienna on 22 September 1988 Maria Schoisswohl (b. Sankt Pölten, 23 November 1958), daughter of Friedrich Schoisswohl and wife Stefanie Jud, without issue
  - Princess Maria Theresia Hemma Elisabeth Felicia Josefa Regina Gräfin von Hohenau (b. Graz, 30 December 1953 - d. Melbourne, 18 August 2011), married civilly in Kensington on 25 July 1978 and religiously in Vienna on 23 September 1978 Aurel Edward Dessewffy de Csernek et Tarkö (b. Greta, New South Wales, 8 April 1950), and had issue:
    - Heinrich Dessewffy de Cserneck et Tarkö (b. Greta, New South Wales, 20 November 1979)
    - Felicity Dessewffy de Cserneck et Tarkö (b. Melbourne, 1 November 1981)
    - Alice Dessewffy de Cserneck et Tarkö (b. Melbourne, 25 January 1984 - d. 12 October 2026), unmarried and without issue
    - Marcus Dessewffy de Cserneck et Tarkö (b. Melbourne, 21 April 1986), married Jessica Louise Feary
      - Aurelia Dessewffy de Csernek et Tarkö (b. 2020)
  - Prince Stefan Alois Rupert Barnabas Karl Maria Graf von Hohenau, who took the surname Heildborgh on 16 January 1989 (b. Graz, 11 June 1957), married in Spitz on 25 August 1988 and divorced in 1991 Andrea von Kloss (b. Vienna, 24 December 1958), without issue
  - Prince Heinrich Christoph Felix Paul Wilhelm Maria Graf von Hohenau (b. Graz, 20 November 1964), unmarried and without issue
- Princess Maria Josepha Henriette Amelie Florestine Zita Franziska Therese Carola Valerie Elisabeth Ludovika (Hollenegg, 6 July 1923 - Marienfeld, Lower Austria, 5 May 2005), unmarried and without issue
- Princess Franziska de Paula Henriette Marie Amelie Mechthildis Benedikta Petra de Alcantara (Hollenegg, 14 June 1930 - Cologne, 23 April 2006), married civilly in Menden on 9 April 1965 and religiously in Hollenegg on 29 May 1965 Rochus Graf von Spee (Borken, 25 October 1925 - Köln, 30 August 1981), and had issue
- Prince Wolfgang Johannes Baptist Johannes Evangelist Ildefons Franz de Paula Joseph Maria (b. Graz, 25 December 1934), married civilly in Wang on 12 July 1970 and religiously in Isareck on 18 July 1970 Gabriele Gräfin Basselet de la Rosée (b. Isareck, 11 March 1949), and had issue:
  - Princess Stephanie Elisabeth Eleonore Maria (b. Salzburg, 12 April 1976)
  - Prince Leopold Franz Karl Maria (b. Salzburg, 21 May 1978), married civilly in Hollenegg on 18 June 2011 Barbara Marie Wichart (b. Vienna, 2. September 1979), and had issue:
    - Prince Lorenz Friedrich Wolfgang Maria (b. Vienna, 22. September 2012)
