= Prince Johannes of Liechtenstein (1873–1959) =

Liechtensteiner prince (1873–1959)

Prince Johannes
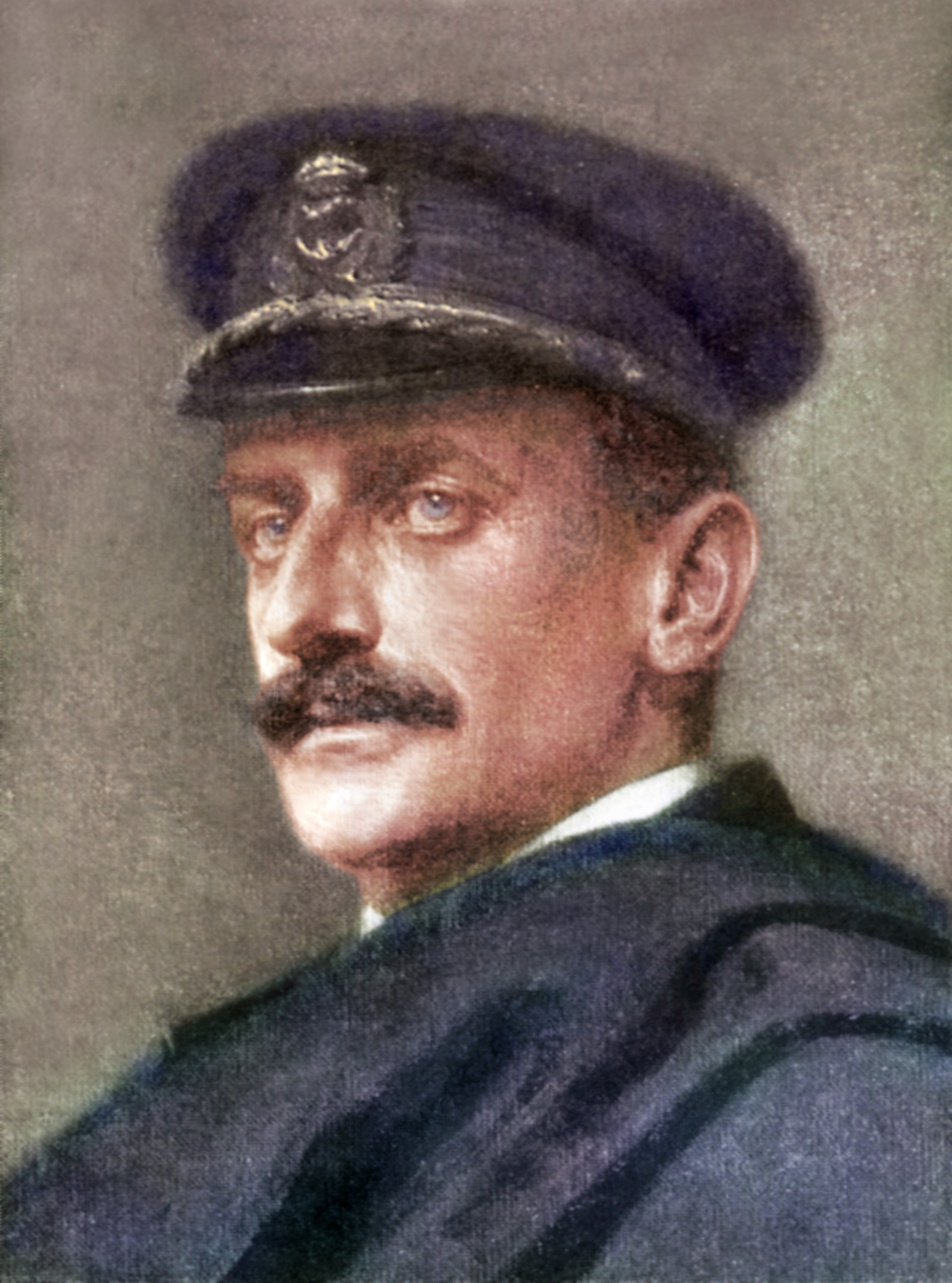
- Born: 6 January 1873; Vienna, Austria-Hungary
- Died: 3 September 1959 (aged 86); Hollenegg, Austria
- Burial: St. Florian Cathedral, Vaduz, Liechtenstein
- Spouse: Countess Mária Gabriella Andrássy de Csíkszentkirály et Krasznahorka (m. 1906)
- Issue: Prince Alfred; Prince Emanuel; Prince Johannes; Prince Constantin
Names
- Johannes Franz Alfred Maria Caspar Melchior Balthasar
- House: Liechtenstein
- Father: Prince Alfred of Liechtenstein
- Mother: Princess Henriette of Liechtenstein

Prince Johannes of Liechtenstein (Johannes Franz Alfred Maria Caspar Melchior Balthasar; 6 January 1873 in Vienna – 3 September 1959 in Hollenegg), was an Austro-Hungarian noble and military leader.

== Life ==
He was the third son of Prince Alfred of Liechtenstein and Princess Henriette of Liechtenstein and brother of Prince Aloys of Liechtenstein.

He had a career in the Austro-Hungarian Navy. Between 1912 and 1915, he was Austro-Hungarian Marine-Attaché in Rome, but was recalled after the Italian declaration of War. Between 1917 and 1918 he was Frigate captain and commander of the Fleet in the harbor of Cattaro. In the last days of the First World War, he represented the Austro-Hungarian Navy in signing the Armistice of Villa Giusti with the Italians.

He became 1,220th Knight of the Order of the Golden Fleece in 1921. After the war, he retired from public life. He headed the Order of St. George until it was dissolved by Nazi Germany.

Johannes died on 3 September 1959, at the age of 86 years old.

== Marriage and issue ==
He married in Budapest on 6 September 1906 Countess Mária Gabriella Andrássy de Csíkszentkirály et Krasznahorka (1886-1961), and had 4 sons:

- Prince Alfred Géza Johann Dionys Maria Josef (Betlér, 27 June 1907 – Frauenthal bei Deutschlandsberg, Styria, 28 December 1991), married at Schloss Horin on 16 April 1932 Ludmila Prinzessin von Lobkowicz (Rožďalovice, Bohemia, 13 August 1908 – Graz, 11 January 1974), and had issue:
  - Princess Maria Christina Anna Eleonore Henriette (Graz, 2 February 1933 – 28 February 2009), married in Hollenegg on 2 July 1960 and divorced in 1973 Roland de Roys de Lédignan Saint Michel (b. Saint-Jean-Cap-Ferrat, Cap Ferrat, 1 October 1934 - 8 December 2017), and had issue:
    - Marie Caroline de Roys de Ledignan Saint Michel (b. Paris, 26 January 1963)
    - René François de Roys de Ledignan Saint Michel (b. Paris, 17 November 1964)
    - Louis Charles de Roys de Ledignan Saint Michel (b. Paris, 12 April 1967), unmarried and without issue
  - Prince Franz Géza Johannes Georg Thaddäus Konrad Maria (Graz, 19 January 1935 – 15 January 2026), married in Osteria Grande, near Bologna, on 14 June 1969 Laura Malvezzi Campeggi (1941 – 2011), and had issue:
    - Princess Laurentia (Graz, 14 February 1971 – Graz, 20 February 1971)
    - Prince Alfred Paolo (b. Graz, 16 November 1972), married civilly in Vaduz on 27 May 2005 and religiously in Castelvecchio on 11 June 2005 Alice Stori Deserti (b. Milan, 13 June 1978), and had issue:
      - Princess Emilia Laura (b. Graz, 11 September 2006)
      - Prince Franz Cosimo (b. Graz, 9 January 2009)
      - Princess Giulia Marina (b. Graz, 28 December 2011)
    - Prince Lukas Wolfgang (b. Graz, 18 November 1974), married civilly in Vaduz on 6 October 2006 and religiously in Beaumont, Haute-Savoie on 21 October 2006 Nathalie Geneviève Etchart (b. Saint-Julien-en-Genevois, 6 September 1972), and had issue:
      - Princess Nora Manureva (b. Deutschlandsberg, 6 April 2008)
      - Princess Lucie Louise (b. Deutschlandsberg, 13 March 2012)
    - Princess Livia Margherita (b. Graz, 7 April 1977), married civilly in Vaduz on 6 June 2012 Richard Turner (b. Ascot, 14 December 1974)
  - Prince Friedrich Emanuel Konrad Thaddäus Maria (b. Graz, 30 September 1937 - d. 20 December 2010), married in Hollenegg on 8 January 1972 Annemarie Ortner (b. Gams bei Frauenthal, 3 May 1948), and had issue:
    - Prince Emanuel Friedrich Eugen Nikolaus (b. Graz, 29 November 1978), married in Regensburg on 7 August 2007 Sonja Maria Monschein (b. Regensburg, 29 January 1982)
      - Prince Leopold Emanuel Friedrich August (b. Graz, 4 November 2010)
      - Prince Heinrich Emanuel Ulrich Nikolaus (b. Graz, 31 July 2012)
      - Princess Charlotte Sophie Ludmilla Maria (b. Graz, 14 April 2014)
    - Prince Ulrich Constantin Wladimir Peter (b. Graz, 12 August 1983)
  - Prince Anton Florian Johannes Constantin Konrad Thaddäus (b. Graz, 21 April 1940), married in Sankt Stefan im Gailtal on 29 June 1968 Rosmarie Freiin Dreihann-Holenia von Sulzberg am Steinhof (b. Klagenfurt, 15 December 1943), and had issue:
    - Princess Ludmilla Stefanie (b. Geneva, 14 January 1974), married civilly in Vaduz on 7 April 1995 and religiously in Sankt Stefan im Gailtal on 15 July 1995 Christoph Andreas Georg Graf Calice (b. Vienna, 30 May 1964), and had issue:
      - Maria Assunta Stefanie Johanna Ludmila Gräfin Calice (Vienna, 15 December 1996)
      - Pius Florian Ferdinand Heinrich Anton Maria Graf Calice (Vienna, 5 April 1998)
      - Christoph Matthias Franz Alfred Maria Graf Calice (Vienna, 13 February 2000)
    - Prince Georg Clemens (b. Männedorf, 17 October 1977)
- Prince Emanuel of Liechtenstein (1908–1987), unmarried and without issue
- Prince Johannes Franz de Paula Gabriel Ildefons Felix Klemens Maria Joseph (Vienna, 18 May 1910 – St. Gallen, 22 January 1975), married in Mariaschein, Bohemia, on 16 November 1936 Karoline Gräfin von Ledebur-Wicheln (Krzemusch, 23 March 1912 – Grabs, 29 November 1996), and had issue:
  - Princess Maria Eleonore Elisabeth Johanna (Mährisch-Sternberg, 23 September 1937 – Bruderholz, 8 June 2002), unmarried and without issue
  - Prince Eugen Hartmann Johannes Franz Maria (b. Mährisch-Sternberg, 20 March 1939), married in Ebenthal on 27 July 1968 Maria Theresia Gräfin von Goëss (b. Ebenthal, 24 May 1945), and had issue:
    - Prince Johannes Leopold Petrus Maria (b. St. Gallen, 28 January 1969), married civilly in Vaduz on 12 April 2001 and religiously in Vienna on 12 May 2001 Kinga Gräfin Károlyi de Nagy-Károly (b. Vienna, 1 October 1973)
    - Princess Anna Theodora Maria (b. St. Gallen, 28 November 1970), married in Moosburg civilly on 10 June 1993 and religiously on 12 June 1993 her cousin Alexander Graf Kottulinsky (b. Graz, 30 September 1967), and had issue:
      - Lorenz Graf Kottulinsky, Freiherr von Kottulin, Krzizkowitz und Dobrzenicz (b. Vienna, 13 July 1996)
      - Ilona Gräfin Kottulinsky, Freiin von Kottulin, Krzizkowitz und Dobrzenicz(b. Vienna, 24 October 1997), married in Neudau on 7. June 2025 Peter Miksch
      - Moritz Graf Kottulinsky, Freiherr von Kottulin, Krzizkowitz und Dobrzenicz (b. Vienna, 6 January 2000)
      - Donata Gräfin Kottulinsky, Freiin von Kottulin, Krzizkowitz und Dobrzenicz(b. Vienna, 19 January 2002)
    - Princess Marie Ileana Josefa (b. Klagenfurt, 20 July 1974), married civilly in Vaduz on 2 June 2000 and religiously in Dellach bei Moosburg, Carinthia, on 10 June 2000 Ferdinand Graf von und zu Trauttmansdorff-Weinsberg (b. Vienna, 24 September 1970), and had issue
    - Princess Sophie Barbara Maria (b. Sankt Veit, 16 April 1984)
  - Prince Albrecht Johannes Géza Augustinus Wilhelm Maria, who took the title of Baron von Landskron on 28 January 1971 (b. Mährisch-Sternberg, 28 May 1940), married firstly in Vaduz on 3 September 1966 and divorced in 1971 Tamara Nyman, created Baroness von Landskron in 1966 (b. Suojärvi, 17 June 1939), and had issue, and married secondly in Las Vegas, Clark County, Nevada, 24 July 1971 Marie-Thérèse (Mylena) Tullio (b. Chevilly-Larue, 11 January 1940), and had issue:
    - Baroness Tatjana Helena von Landskron de Liechtenstein (b. Neuilly-sur-Seine, 2 March 1965 – Zürich, 13 January 2001), married in Speicher bei St. Gallen in 1989 Bruno Roland Thurnherr-Landskron (b. St. Gallen, 29 October 1962), and had issue:
      - Constantin Johannes von Landskron (b. St. Gallen, 18 November 1989) married in Vienna in 2026 Greta von Landskron (b. Hamburg, 23 December 1997)
      - Tara Alina von Landskron (b. St. Gallen, 1 March 1994)
    - Baron Albrecht Johannes Christoph von Landskron (b. Chur, 2 April 1967), unmarried and without issue
    - Baroness Lorenza von Landskron (b. Neuilly-sur-Seine, 16 April 1973), married in Paris civilly on 29 February 1996 and religiously on 2 March 1996 and divorced or separated (at her marriage she was referred to as Prinzessin von und zu Liechtenstein) Don Antonio del Balzo di Presenzano (b. Naples, 21 April 1961 - Rome, 10 September 2025) and had issue by Francesco Trapani (b. Rome, 10 March 1957):
      - Donna Vittoria del Balzo di Presenzano (b. 2001)
      - Allegra Trapani (b. 2004)
  - Princess Barbara Eleonora Marie (b. Mährisch-Sternberg, 9 July 1942), married in Paris on 2 November 1973 as his second wife Alexander, Prince of Yugoslavia (White Lodge, Richmond Park, London Borough of Richmond upon Thames, Surrey, 13 August 1924, - Paris, 12 May 2016), and had issue
    - Prince Dushan of Yugoslavia (b. St. Gallen, 25 September 1977)
- Prince Constantin Franz Nikolaus Karl Heinrich Dagobert Anton von Padua Ildefons Maria (Vienna, 23 December 1911 – Grabs, 28 March 2001), married firstly in Vienna civilly on 18 March 1941 and religiously on 19 March 1941 Countess Maria Elisabeth von Leutzendorff (Branky, 23 May 1921 – killed in an air raid in World War II in Vienna, 10 September 1944), and had issue, and married secondly in Vaduz civilly on 21 December 1976 and religiously on 10 January 1977 Countess Ilona Mária Antónia Erzsébet Gabriella Katalin Karolina Esterházy de Galántha (Sárosd, 17 May 1921 - 2 August 2019), without issue.

== Sources ==
- Liechtenstein Johannes von 1873, Prinz
- Rootsweb Ancestry
