= Princess Henriette of Liechtenstein =

Princess Henriette
- Princess Alfred of Liechtenstein
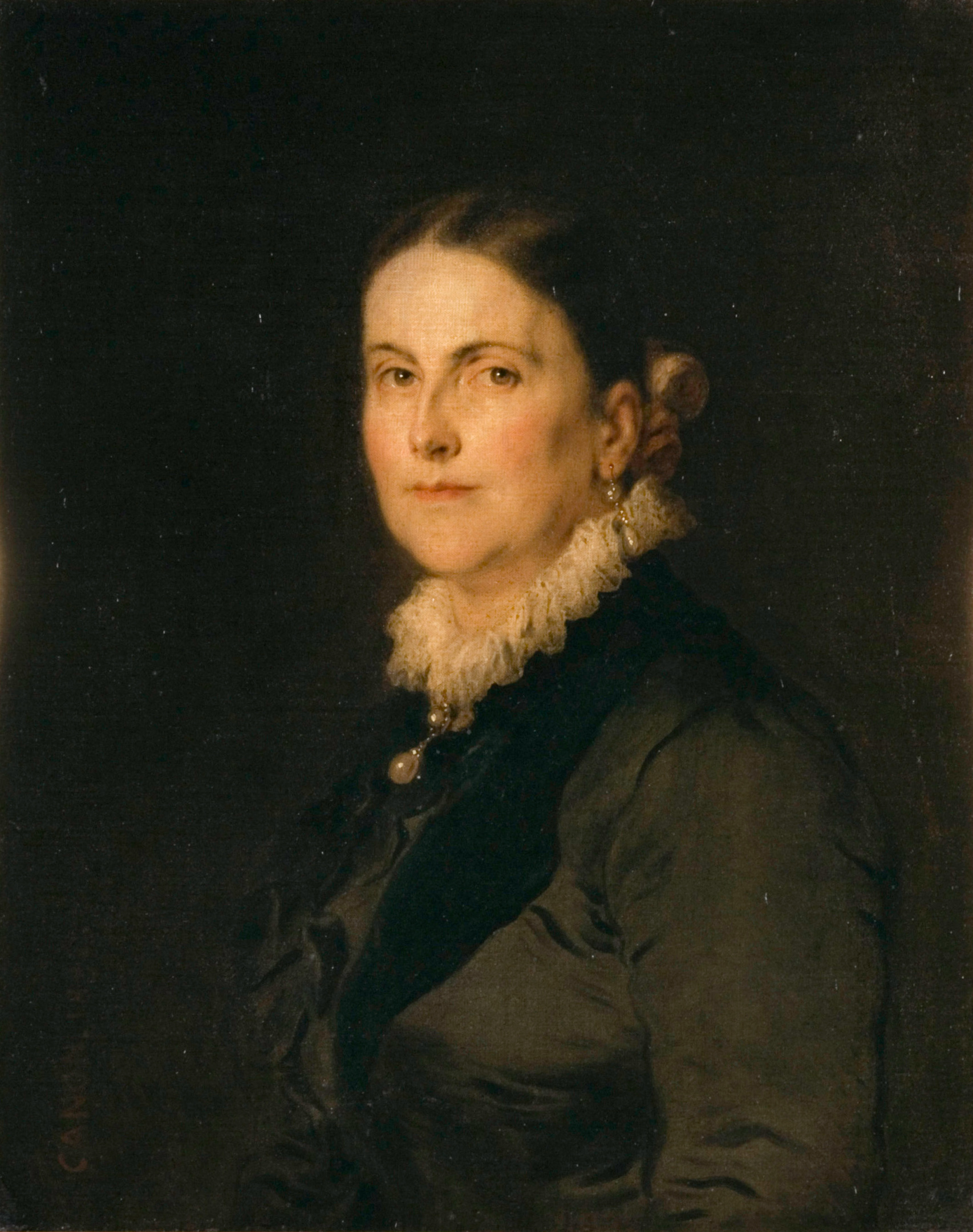
- Portrait of Princess Henriette von Liechtenstein by Hans Canon c. 1882, part of the Princely Collections, Vaduz–Vienna.
- Born: 6 June 1843; Schloss Liechtenstein, Lower Austria
- Died: 24 December 1931 (aged 88); Frauenthal Castle, Styria
- Spouse: Prince Alfred of Liechtenstein (m. 1865; died 1907)
- Issue: Princess Franziska; Prince Franz; Prince Aloys; Princess Maria Theresia; Prince Johannes; Prince Alfred Roman; Prince Heinrich; Prince Karl Aloys; Prince Georg
Names
- German: Henriette Maria Norberta
- House: Liechtenstein
- Father: Alois II, Prince of Liechtenstein
- Mother: Countess Franziska Kinsky of Wchinitz and Tettau

Princess Henriette of Liechtenstein (German: Henriette Maria Norberta, Prinzessin von und zu Liechtenstein; 6 June 1843 – 24 December 1931) was a Princess of Liechtenstein and member of the Princely House of Liechtenstein.

== Family ==
Henriette was the seventh daughter and eighth child of Alois II, Prince of Liechtenstein and Countess Franziska Kinsky of Wchinitz and Tettau. She was a sister of Johann II, Prince of Liechtenstein and Franz I, Prince of Liechtenstein.

== Marriage and issue ==
On 26 April 1865, in Vienna, she married her first cousin Prince Alfred of Liechtenstein (Prague, 11 June 1842 - Frauenthal castle, 8 October 1907), the son of Prince Franz de Paula of Liechtenstein (1802–1887) and Countess Julia Eudoxia Potocka-Piława (1818–1895), older brother of Prince Franz de Paula of Liechtenstein, and cousin and brother-in-law of Franz I of Liechtenstein. The couple had ten children together.

- Princess Franziska Maria Johanna (Vienna, 21 August 1866 - Schloss Frauenthal, 23 December 1939), unmarried and without issue
- Prince Franz de Paula Maria (Vienna, 24 January 1868 - Graz, 26 August 1929), unmarried and without issue
- Princess Julia (Vienna, 24 January 1868 - Vienna, 24 January 1868)
- Prince Aloys of Liechtenstein (1869–1955); married Archduchess Elisabeth Amalie of Austria; renounced his succession rights in favor of his son Franz Joseph II, Prince of Liechtenstein in 1923
- Princess Maria Theresia Julie (Hollenegg, 9 September 1871 - Schloss Frauenthal, 9 April 1964), unmarried and without issue
- Prince Johannes Franz Alfred Maria Caspar Melchior Balthasar (Vienna, 6 January 1873 - Hollenegg, 3 September 1959), 1,220th Knight of the Order of the Golden Fleece in 1921, married in Budapest on 6 September 1906 Marie Gräfin Andrássy von Czik-Szent-Király und Krasna-Horka (Budapest, 7 December 1886 - Vienna, 14 December 1961), and had issue
- Prince Alfred Roman (Vienna, 6 April 1875 - Waldstein bei Peggau, Styria, 25 October 1930), married in Munich on 19 February 1912 Theresia Maria Prinzessin zu Oettingen-Oettingen und Oettingen-Wallerstein (Munich, 1 June 1887 - Waldstein, 29 May 1971), and had issue
- Prince Heinrich Aloys Maria Joseph (Hollenegg, 21 June 1877 - k.i.a. in World War I in Warsaw, 16 August 1915), unmarried and without issue
- Prince Karl Aloys (Frauenthal, 16 September 1878 - Frauenthal, 20 June 1955), married civilly in Stuttgart on 31 March 1921 and religiously in Tegernsee on 5 April 1921 Elisabeth Prinzessin von Urach Gräfin von Württemberg Princess of Lithuania (Schloss Lichtenstein, 23 August 1894 - Frauenthal, 13 October 1962), daughter of Mindaugas II of Lithuania and first wife Duchess Amalie in Bayern, and had issue
- Prince Georg Hartmann Joseph Maria Mathäus (Pater Ildefons, O.S.B.) (Vienna, 22 February 1880 - Hollenegg, 14 April 1931), a Benedictine Monk in Prague

== Ancestry ==
Ancestors of Princess Henriette of Liechtenstein

8. Franz Joseph I, Prince of Liechtenstein
4. Johann I Joseph, Prince of Liechtenstein
9. Countess Leopoldine of Sternberg
2. Alois II, Prince of Liechtenstein
10. Joachim Egon, Landgrave of Fürstenberg-Weitra
5. Landgravine Josepha of Fürstenberg-Weitra
11. Countess Sophia Maria of Oettingen-Wallerstein
1. Princess Henriette of Liechtenstein
12. Joseph Ernst, Prince Kinsky of Wchinitz and Tettau
6. Count Franz de Paula Joseph Kinsky of Wchinitz and Tettau
13. Countess Rosa of Harrach-Rohrau and Thannhausen
3. Countess Franziska Kinsky of Wchinitz and Tettau
14. Count Rudolf of Wrbna and Freudenthal
7. Countess Therese of Wrbna and Freudenthal
15. Countess Maria Theresia of Kaunitz-Rietberg
