= Hortensia Fussy =

Austrian sculptor (born 1954)

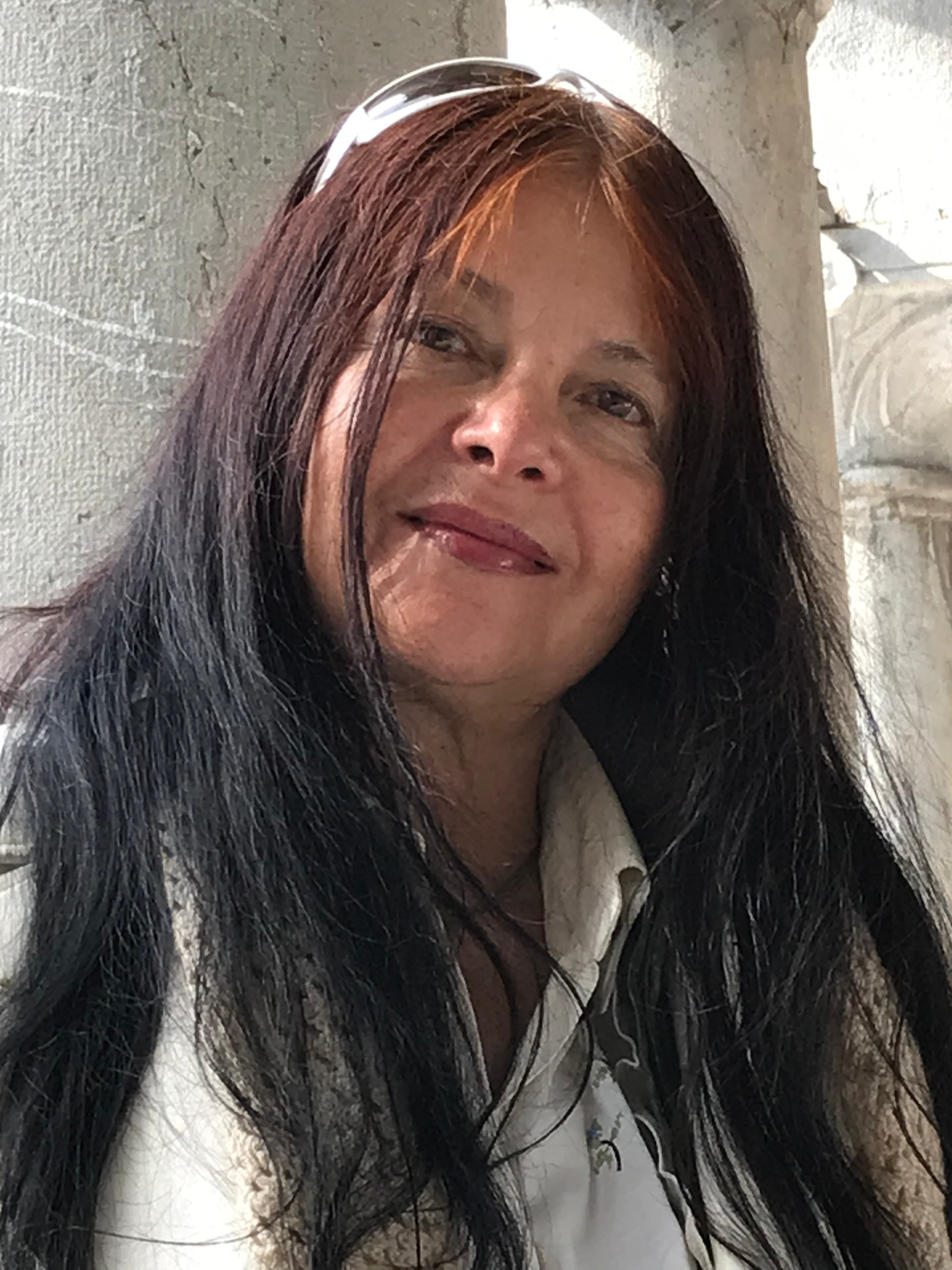
Hortensia in 2022

Hortensia Fussy (also Hortensia; born 25 March 1954 in Graz) is an Austrian sculptor.

== Biography ==
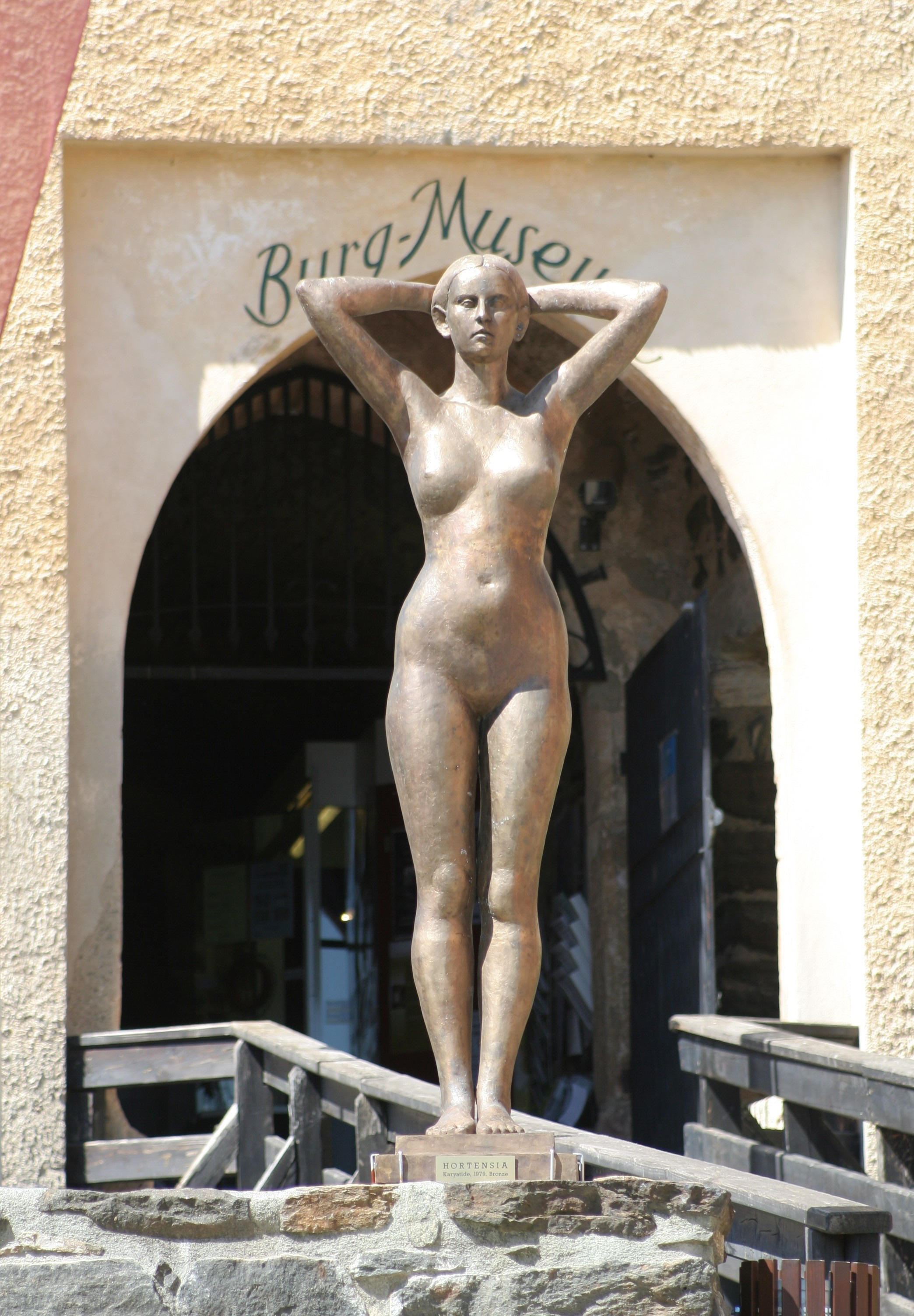
Hortensia: Caryatid, 1977–1983. Burg Deutschlandsberg

Hortensia studied sculpture at the School of Applied Arts Graz with Josef Pillhofer from 1970 to 1972 and at the Academy of Fine Arts Vienna with Fritz Wotruba from 1972 to 1975. She was his last student. Since 1975 she has been a freelance artist. She held her first exhibition in 1984 at Galerie Würthle, and since then numerous solo exhibitions in Europe, the United States, and Africa. From 2003 to 2012 she ran the Hortensia Drawing School for Figure and Landscape, Bad Gams, Western Styria.

On 2 May 2015, she opened the "Sculpture House Hortensia" in Bad Gams, Western Styria. As a permanent exhibition space, it houses sculptures from all creative periods. The sculpture workroom and the drawing room are located opposite the house.

For her "extensive artistic work" she was awarded the Golden Decoration of Honor for Services to the Republic of Austria by Federal President Alexander Van der Bellen in 2019.

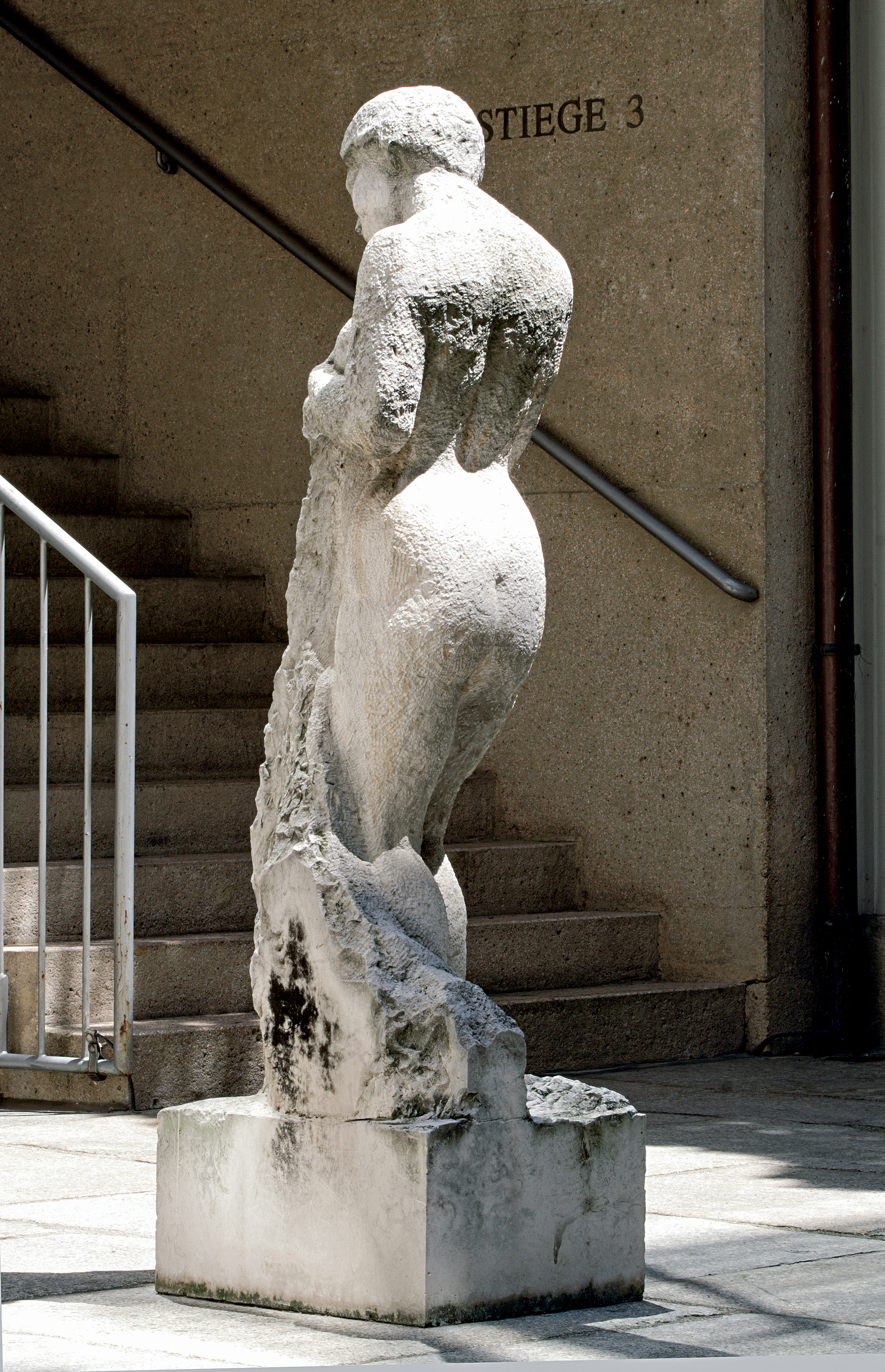
Hortensia: Hommage à Courbet, 1988–95. Palais Harrach, Vienna

== Artistic activity ==
The work of the Austrian sculptor, draftswoman and painter focuses on the human figure. "Her sculptural work is in the tradition of classical modernism. She creates modern classical-figurative works, which are characterized by reduction of shape and rigor, occasional archaism, absolute technical certainty and full mastery of artistic means. Her oeuvre is an important position of Austrian figurative sculpture."

"Hortensia Fussy continues a line of development in the visual arts of Austria, at the beginning of which one can place Gustav Klimt and Egon Schiele, and which was continued by artists such as the painter Herbert Boeckl and the sculptor Josef Pillhofer. However, the greatest influence on Hortensia Fussy's artistic career may have come from her teacher, the eminent Austrian sculptor Fritz Wotruba.".

== Sculptures against the trend ==
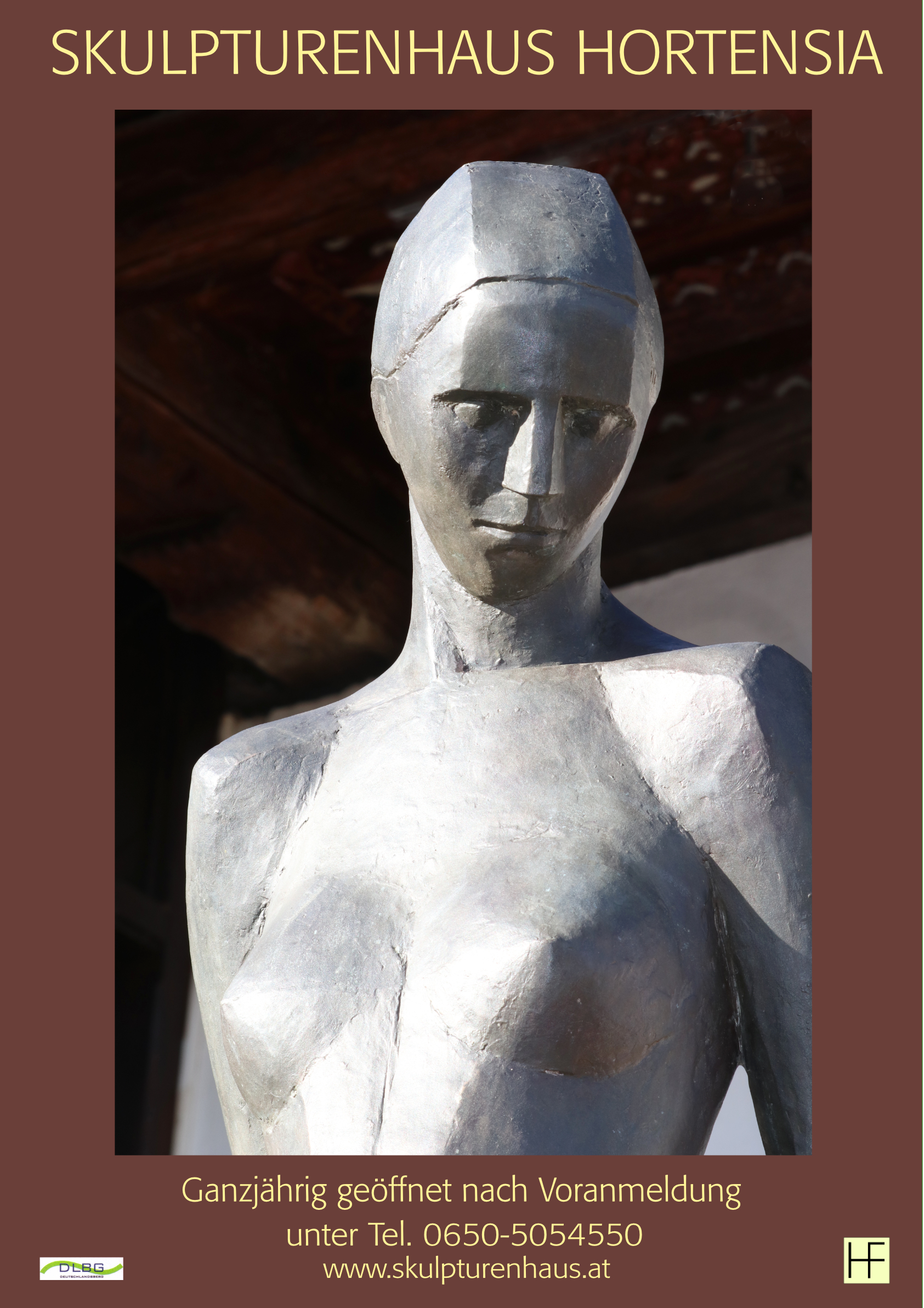
Hortensia: Poster of Sculpture House Hortensia, showing Grosse Form Daria, Bronze, 2018–2019

Through her consistent effort to assign the highest value within her artistic work to the quality of shape, Hortensia consciously opposes the prevailing art trend: "Like her two great teachers, she again goes a step further, as her sculptures no longer show a fault line between pure shape and nature study. Her approach is consistently idiosyncratic and free of short-living trends. Hortensia creates classically figurative works that appear strictly composed and clear, and whose magic and sensuality are primarily coming from one aspect: the harmony of shape and nature. The subject of the representation is predominantly the human figure, the "royal motif" among all pictorial representations. In a quite long process of creation and development she forms her sculptures of appealing unity, her works are free of alienation, irritation or other disturbing factors."

In an early phase of her work, "Hortensia pays special attention to the transformation from the second into the third dimension, which transcends the usual connection between preliminary drawn study and executed sculpture. With sculptures based on paintings by Piero della Francesca, Francisco de Goya, Albrecht Dürer, Jan Vermeer, or Gustave Courbet, she embarked on this path of 'spatialization' in the early 1980s.", among others with the Figure after Goya, 1980; Figure after Dürer, 1981; Hommage a Courbet, 1988-95.

Shape is always Hortensia's central theme and the starting point of her artistic work. "Under the heading Shape and Figure, Hortensia deals with some principles according to which the perceptual material taken in by the eyes is ordered in order to be grasped by the human mind." In the interplay of the two concepts, an approach to Hortensia's aesthetic imperative opens up: "Earthy, centered, sensual, and moderate are what my figures should be! " "The point here is that the negative, the positive, that the roundness, the horizontal, the diagonal, that is, essential spatial dimensions, which ultimately also determine our vision, can change the view of things within the viewer. ""For this process stands, for example, the sculpture Large Form Daria. The female figure lives from the reduced, crystalline forms. Dominantly placed in bronze in the open space, she is enough for herself. She is free of all thoughts and content remnants, of space and time, stripped of all obligations, with the exception of the legality of form: a world language of art!" From 2002 to 2010, the artist carried out a series of exhibitions under the title "Shape and Figure", including at the Styrian Fire Museum, 2002; Bratislava, 2003; Washington, 2004; Moscow, 2008; Deutschlandsberg Castle, 2009-2010.

== Permanently exhibited works (selection) ==
- Monument to President Rudolf Sallinger, Rudolf Sallinger Square, Vienna.
- Caryatid, Deutschlandsberg Castle
- Figure after Goya, Vienna Insurance Group Collection, Ringturm Vienna.
- Hommage a Courbet - Palais Harrach, Vienna (until 2014), since then Rathausplatz Deutschlandsberg
- Muse3 (after Correggio) - Langenzersdorf Museum (formerly Hanak Museum)
- Monument Commendatore Reinhold Purr - Styrian Fire Museum
- Head Space Group - Municipality of Deutschlandsberg

== Graphic work ==
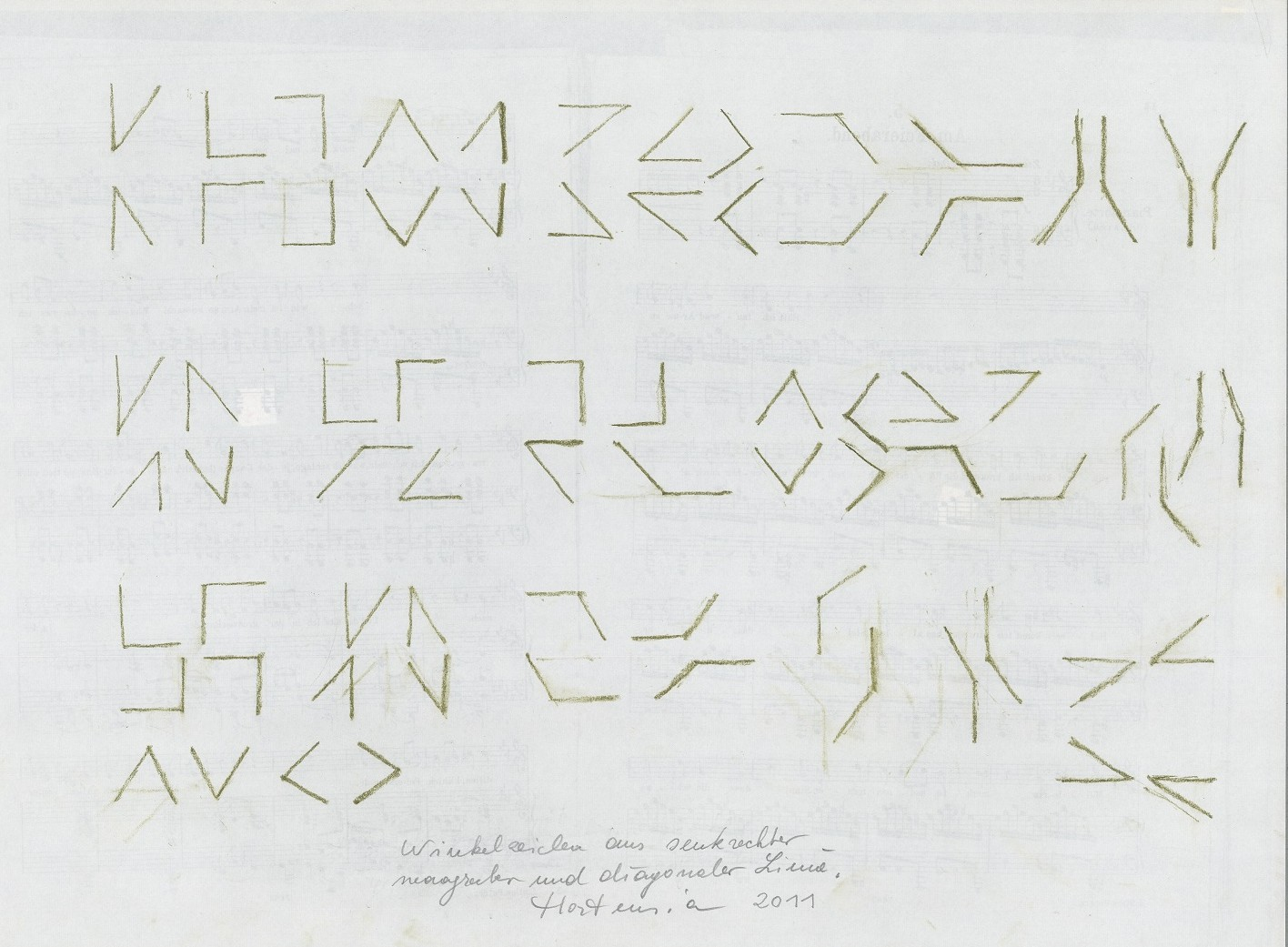
Hortensia: the pictorial alphabet

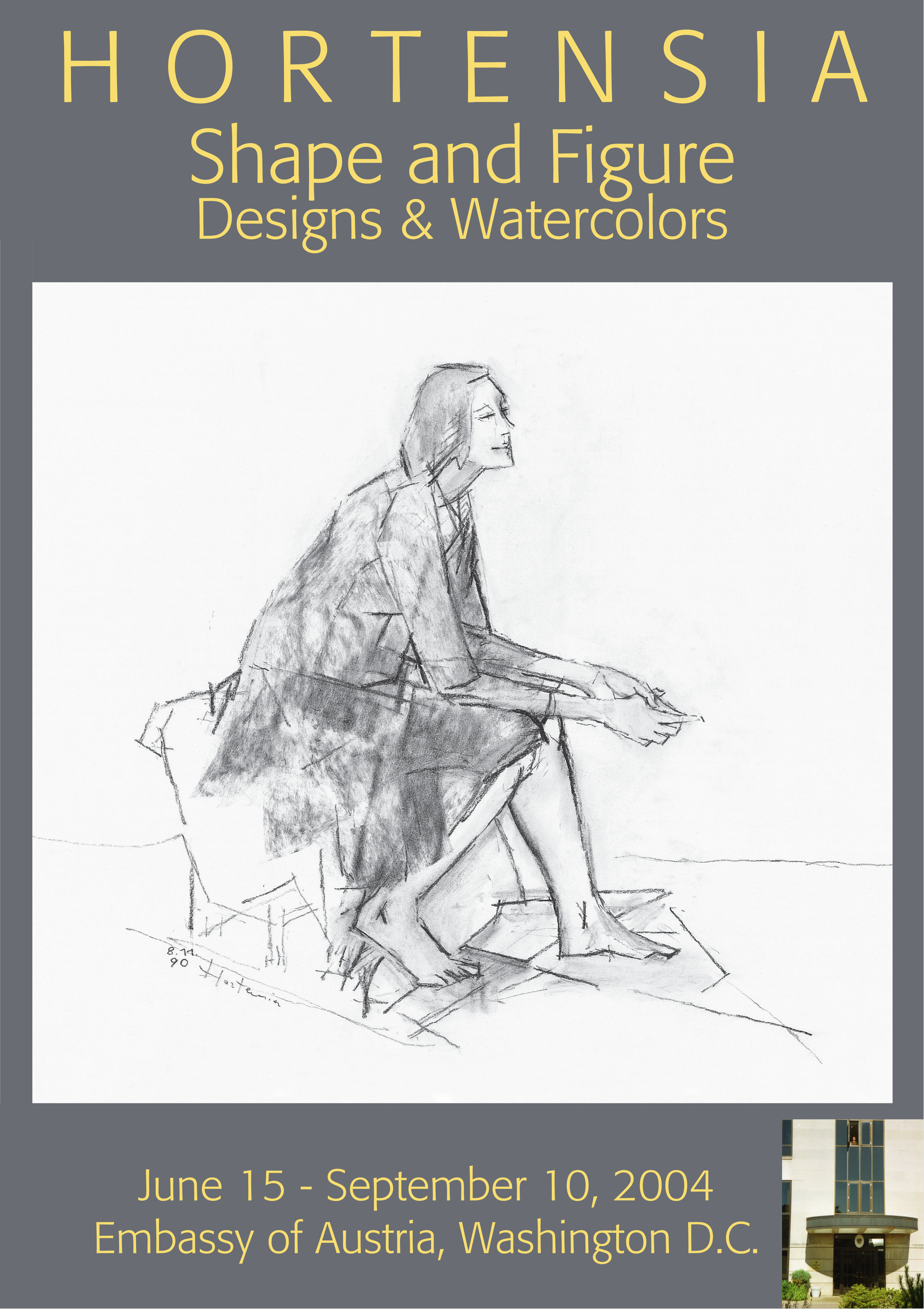
Poster of the exhibition in Washington D.C.

Since 1969, Hortensia has been making drawings. Her graphic work is extensive and of high quality: "Above all, her way of drawing, of leaving graphisms standing, of executing strokes to make sense of lines without attaching meaning to them, of using hatching to emphasize brightness and develop darks, is unrivaled."</ref "<ref name=Denchev-Shape-and-Space>Konstantin Denchev, art historian, from "Form and Space", 2014.</ref>"The line that Hortensia draws feels its way along the boundaries of the motif, and its power of abstraction clarifies the formations. "Nature" and human work intertwine and highlight each other. Light becomes color: if line abstracts figures, color breathes sensual life into abstraction. "

Parallel to the sculptural work (sculptures, nude drawings), cycles of drawings and watercolors are created during numerous trips in Europe and Africa as spatial images of landscapes, mountain ranges and architecture (among others, Landscape cycle Spain (1983-1985), Tuscany and Umbria (1987-1990), Portugal (1997), Dalmatia (1999-2002), Egypt (2000), Sicily (2002), Italian Dolomites (2003-2018)). Nude drawings, architectural drawings and watercolors are shown in her exhibitions under the title "Form and Space", most recently in 2018 in the "Stone Room" of the Landhaus in Graz. "Hortensia's figures create an oasis for beauty, not as a vanishing point, but as an expression of clarity and insight. Hortensia is committed to these values as a draftswoman and sculptor. She is concerned with the sensual experience of reality, with the restriction that only the use of unambiguous pictorial means creates the prerequisite for artistically translating the sensual experience. The artist tries to extract what seems essential to her from the abundance of impressions. It is a process of omission, of reduction, a selection that eliminates what would weaken the invisible order and picks up what can be ordered - for only this narrow ridge is essential to her, where pictorial order and pictorial spirit meet."

Underlying Hortensia's works is the consistent application of the pictorial alphabet she herself developed with such clarity. "The conscious use of the pictorial alphabet, as a summary of 24 angular connections from combination of a vertical, horizontal or oblique line, becomes with her a drawing procedure for grasping given space." Thus, these pictorial signs are a kind of script for translating vivid reality into the pictorial work. The pictorial alphabet was documented in the book Hortensia - Shape and Space (2014).

"Hortensia has developed her own conception of the human figure as a reorientation: This makes her œuvre both modern and timeless.".

== Awards ==
- 1987: Theodor Körner Award
- 1999: Liesl Bareuther Award, Künstlerhaus Wien
- 2014: Grand Medal of Honor of the Province of Styria
- 2019: Decoration of Honor for Services to the Republic of Austria (1952)|Golden Decoration of Honor for Services to the Republic of Austria

== Solo exhibitions (selection) ==
- 1984: Gallery Würthle, Vienna, Austria
- 1990: Gallery Norbert Blaeser, Düsseldorf, Germany
- 1996: Neustadt City Hall, Prague, Czech Republic
- 1997: International Festival Sarajevo Winter, Bosnia & Hercegovina
- 1998: Forum Lagos 1998, Portugal
- 1998: Kulturhaus, Graz, Austria
- 1999: UKV Saarbrücken, Germany
- 2001: Cairo Opera Art Gallery, Egypt.
- 2002: Shape and Figure, Styrian Fire Museum Groß St. Florian, Austria
- 2004: Austrian Embassy, Washington, USA
- 2008: Central House of Artists, Moscow, Russia
- 2009-2010: Museum Archeo Norico, Castle Deutschlandsberg, Austria
- 2011: Sculptures and their perspectives, University of Graz, UZT, Austria
- 2014: Shape and Space, Museum Archeo Norico, Deutschlandsberg Castle, Austria.
- 2016: Shape and Space, Langenzersdorf Museum (formerly Hanak Museum), Austria.
- 2018: Grazer Landhaus, Steinerner Saal
- 2023: The Breath of Bronze, Werner Berg Museum, Sculpture Garden.

== Literature ==
- Form and Figure, 2002.
- Shape and Figure (Sculptures), 2008, ISBN 978-80-969998-0-4.
- Double Games, 2009, ISBN 978-3-9502799-0-0.
- Shape and Space, 2014, ISBN 978-3-9502799-1-7.
- Sculpture House Hortensia, 2020, ISBN 978-3-9502799-2-4.
