= Prince Franz of Liechtenstein =

Liechtensteiner prince (1868–1929)

Prince Franz
- Born: 24 January 1868; Vienna, Austria-Hungary
- Died: 26 August 1929 (aged 61); Graz, Austria
Names
- Franz de Paula Maria
- House: Liechtenstein
- Father: Prince Alfred of Liechtenstein
- Mother: Princess Henriette of Liechtenstein

Prince Franz of Liechtenstein (Franz de Paula Maria; 24 January 1868 – 26 August 1929) was the eldest son of Prince Alfred of Liechtenstein and Princess Henriette of Liechtenstein and uncle of Franz Joseph II.

== Biography ==
Franz attended the Schottengymnasium from 1878 to 1886 then joined the Austro-Hungarian military, where he served as a first lieutenant until 1896. He travelled to North America, Africa and Asia with his uncle Prince Heinrich of Liechtenstein, a "fun-loving world traveller" and expedition photographer. In 1902 Franz, alongside his father, mother, and two of his siblings renounced his Austrian citizenship and became a naturalized citizen in Vaduz.

Following his father's death in 1907 Franz inherited the family's property in Hollenegg and Riegersburg and he was a hereditary member of the Austrian manor house from 1907 to 1918. He was a participant in discussions for the reconstruction of Vaduz Castle in 1905. Following his brother Prince Alois of Liechtenstein renouncing his rights to the succession to the Liechtenstein throne on 26 February 1923, Franz renounced his right to the regency of Liechtenstein in favour of Alois's son and Franz's nephew Franz Joseph on 1 March the same year.

Franz died unmarried on 26 August 1929 at the age of 61.

== Honours ==
- Knight of the Sovereign Order of Malta (1914)
