= Prince Alfred of Liechtenstein (1842–1907) =

Liechtensteiner prince (1842–1907)

Prince Alfred
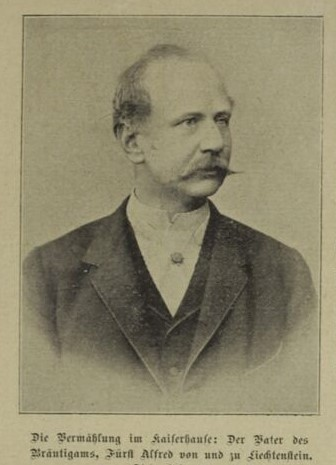
- Prince Alfred in 1903
- Born: 11 July 1842; Frauenthal Castle, Austrian Empire
- Died: 8 October 1907 (aged 65); Vranov, Austria-Hungary
- Burial: Church of the Nativity of the Virgin Mary, Brno
- Spouse: Princess Henriette of Liechtenstein (m. 1865)
- Issue: Princess Franziska; Prince Franz; Prince Aloys; Princess Maria Theresia; Prince Johannes; Prince Alfred Roman; Prince Heinrich; Prince Karl Aloys; Prince Georg
Names
- Alfred Aloys Eduard
- House: Liechtenstein
- Father: Prince Franz de Paula of Liechtenstein
- Mother: Countess Julia Eudoxia Potocka-Piława

Prince Alfred Louis of Liechtenstein (Alfred Aloys Eduard; 11 July 1842 – 8 October 1907) was a major in the Imperial Austrian Army and later a member of the Imperial Council. He was the son of Prince Franz de Paula of Liechtenstein and Countess Julia Eudoxia Potocka-Piława, older brother of Prince Louis of Liechtenstein, and cousin and brother-in-law of Franz I of Liechtenstein.

== Career ==
Prince Alfred studied law in Vienna before joining the Imperial Austrian Army, retiring in 1866 with the rank of major. From there, he entered into politics and was a member of the Landtag of Styria from 1873 to 1899 and also the Imperial Council of Austria from 1879; he was a member of the House of Lords from 1887. In the House of Lords, Alfred was considered a Catholic-conservative and the leader of the clerical wing of the right, believing in a corporatist state; in 1881, alongside his brother Prince Aloys, founded the Christian-social reformist Liechtenstein Club.

In 1899 Alfred was given a mandate to form a government, but ultimately rejected it due to resistance from left-wing parties. In 1902 Alfred, his wife, and a few of their children renounced their Austrian citizenship and became naturalized citizens in Vaduz. The following year, he donated 2,000 Austrian krone to the Vaduz poor relief fund.

He was the 1,143rd Knight of the Order of the Golden Fleece in Austria in 1903.

== Marriage and issue ==
On 26 April 1865, in Vienna, he married his first cousin Princess Henriette Maria Norberta (Schloss Liechtenstein bei Mödling, 6 June 1843 – Schloss Frauenthal, 24 December 1931), daughter of Aloys II, Prince of Liechtenstein. They had ten children together.

- Princess Franziska Maria Johanna (Vienna, 21 August 1866 – Schloss Frauenthal, 23 December 1939), unmarried and without issue
- Prince Franz of Liechtenstein (Vienna, 24 January 1868 – Graz, 26 August 1929), unmarried and without issue.
- Princess Julia (Vienna, 24 January 1868 – Vienna, 24 January 1868)
- Prince Alois of Liechtenstein (1869–1955); married Archduchess Elisabeth Amalie of Austria; renounced his succession rights in favor of his son Franz Joseph II, Prince of Liechtenstein in 1923
- Princess Maria Theresia Julie (Hollenegg, 9 September 1871 – Schloss Frauenthal, 9 April 1964), unmarried and without issue
- Prince Johannes Franz Alfred Maria Caspar Melchior Balthasar (Vienna, 6 January 1873 – Hollenegg, 3 September 1959), 1,220th Knight of the Order of the Golden Fleece in 1921, married in Budapest on 6 September 1906 Marie Gräfin Andrássy von Czik-Szent-Király und Krasna-Horka (Budapest, 7 December 1886 – Vienna, 14 December 1961), and had issue
- Prince Alfred Roman (Vienna, 6 April 1875 – Waldstein bei Peggau, Styria, 25 October 1930), married in Munich on 19 February 1912 Theresia Maria Prinzessin zu Oettingen-Oettingen und Oettingen-Wallerstein (Munich, 1 June 1887 – Waldstein, 29 May 1971). They had four children together.
- Prince Heinrich Aloys Maria Joseph (Hollenegg, 21 June 1877 – k.i.a. in World War I in Warsaw, 16 August 1915), unmarried and without issue
- Prince Karl Aloys (Frauenthal, 16 September 1878 – Frauenthal, 20 June 1955), married civilly in Stuttgart on 31 March 1921 and religiously in Tegernsee on 5 April 1921 Elisabeth Prinzessin von Urach Gräfin von Württemberg Princess of Lithuania (Schloss Lichtenstein, 23 August 1894 – Frauenthal, 13 October 1962), daughter of Mindaugas II of Lithuania and first wife Duchess Amalie in Bayern, and had issue.
- Prince Georg Hartmann Joseph Maria Mathäus (Pater Ildefons, O.S.B.) (Vienna, 22 February 1880 – Hollenegg, 14 April 1931), a Benedictine Monk in Prague

Alfred died on 8 October 1907, aged 65.
