= Princess Elisabeth of Urach =

Princess Elizabeth of Urach
- Princess Karl Aloys of Liechtenstein
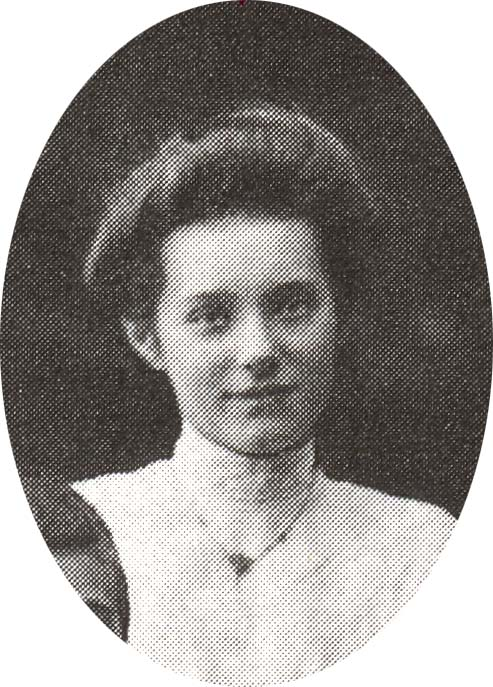
- Elisabeth in 1907
- Born: 23 August 1894; Lichtenstein Castle (Württemberg)
- Died: 13 October 1962 (aged 68); Frauenthal Castle
- Burial: Vaduz Cathedral
- Spouse: Prince Karl Aloys of Liechtenstein (m. 1921; died 1955)
- Issue: Prince Wilhelm Alfred; Princess Maria Josepha; Princess Franziska; Prince Wolfgang
Names
- Elizabeth Auguste Marie Florestine Luise
- House: House of Urach
- Father: Wilhelm Karl, Duke of Urach
- Mother: Duchess Amalie in Bavaria

Elizabeth Auguste Marie Florestine Luise, Princess of Urach and Countess of Württemberg (23 August 1894 at Lichtenstein Castle (Württemberg) – 13 October 1962 in Frauenthal Castle in Styria) was the wife of Prince Karl Aloys of Liechtenstein.

== Life ==
Elizabeth was the second daughter of Duke Wilhelm Karl of Urach (1864–1928) and his first wife Duchess Amalie in Bavaria (1865–1912). After the death of her mother in May 1912, she managed the housekeeping of her father's home and looked after the education of her younger siblings.

Prince Joachim of Prussia (1890–1920), the youngest son of Emperor Wilhelm II courted her in vain. Elizabeth and her father rejected him because he was a Protestant and they insisted on educating children according to Catholicism.

During World War I Elizabeth corresponded with her father, who had the rank of a lieutenant general and was commander of the 26th Division in France, Russia and Serbia. Their letters are now in the main governmental archive in Stuttgart.

== Marriage and later life ==
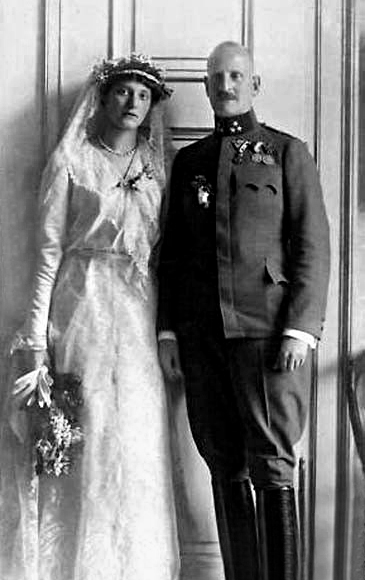
Wedding of Prince Karl Aloys of Liechtenstein and Elisabeth, Duchess of Urach and Countess of Württemberg.

In spring 1921 she married Prince Karl Aloys of Liechtenstein (1878–1955), a son of Prince Alfred and Princess Henriette. Prince Karl Aloys was Imperial and Royal Cavalry Master (Rittmeister) until the end of the monarchy of Austria-Hungary and from 13 December 1918 to 15 September 1920 temporarily Prime Minister (Landesverweser) of the Principality of Liechtenstein.

They had four children:

- Wilhelm Alfred (1922-2006).
- Maria Josepha (1923-2005).
- Franziska (1930-2006).
- Wolfgang (born 1934).

Her last resting place is the burial vault of Vaduz Cathedral.

== Literature ==
- Wolfgang Schmierer: Article on Elisabeth, Prinzessin von und zu Liechtenstein [nee Fürstin von Urach]. In: Das Haus Württemberg. Ein biographisches Lexikon, editor: Sönke Lorenz, Dieter Mertens und Volker Press, Kohlhammer Verlag, Stuttgart 1997, ISBN 3-17-013605-4, S. 391.
