= Prince Wolfgang of Liechtenstein =

Prince of Liechtenstein and diplomat

- Prince of Liechtenstein; Count of Rietberg
- Born: December 25, 1934 (age 91); Graz, Austria
- Spouse: Countess Gabrielle Basselet de La Rosée (m. 1970)
- Issue: Princess Stephanie of Liechtenstein; Prince Leopold of Liechtenstein
- House: Liechtenstein
- Father: Prince Karl Aloys of Liechtenstein
- Mother: Princess Elisabeth of Urach

Ambassador of Liechtenstein to Switzerland
- In office July 1996 – June 2001
- Preceded by: Prince Nikolaus of Liechtenstein
- Succeeded by: Prince Stefan of Liechtenstein

Personal details
- Education: University of Vienna
- Occupation: Diplomat • lawyer • insurance executive

Prince Wolfgang of Liechtenstein (born Wolfgang Johannes Baptist Johannes Evangelist Ildefons Franz de Paula Josef Maria von und zu Liechtenstein, Count of Rietberg; 25 December 1934) is a member of the Princely House of Liechtenstein who served as Liechtenstein's ambassador to Switzerland from 1996 to 2001.

== Early life and education ==
Wolfgang was born on 25 December 1934, in Graz, the youngest of four children of Prince Karl Aloys of Liechtenstein and his wife, Elisabeth, née Princess Elisabeth of Urach. He grew up in Styria, Austria.

He attended the Collegium Marianum in Vaduz, and the Abbey Gymnasium in Seckau. He later studied law at the University of Vienna, where he received the academic degree of Magister.

== Career ==
After completing his education, Wolfgang completed internships at a court and an auditing firm. He then worked as a lawyer and later as a divisional manager at a German-American real estate company until 1980. From 1980 to 1983, he worked as a consultant for a property developer in Salzburg.

In 1983, he became a director of Grazer Wechselseitige Versicherung (GRAWE), an Austrian insurance company. He was based in Salzburg and remained with the company until becoming ambassador.

=== Ambassador to Switzerland ===
In July 1996, Wolfgang succeeded Prince Nikolaus of Liechtenstein as Liechtenstein's ambassador to Switzerland, with his diplomatic post based in Bern.

Wolfgang hosted an event at the Casino Bern marking the 75th anniversary of the 1923 Customs Treaty between Switzerland and Liechtenstein in 1998. During the event, he conveyed a message of thanks from Prince Hans-Adam II to Swiss federal and cantonal officials for their summed cooperation with Liechtenstein.

In 1999, he signed agreements between Liechtenstein and Switzerland concerning telecommunications regulation and cross-border road passenger transport. During an investigation into allegations of money laundering involving Liechtenstein in December of that year, Wolfgang met Swiss Federal Councillor Ruth Metzler. He informed her of the existence of an anonymous 1997 letter containing allegations concerning political and business figures in Liechtenstein and provided her with a copy. The Swiss Federal Department of Justice and Police said it had not previously been aware of the letter or its contents.

In November 2000, Wolfgang confirmed that he would leave the ambassadorship at the end of May 2001, citing age. He had originally intended to leave before the 2001 state elections, but agreed to remain in office at the request of Prime Minister Mario Frick and Foreign Minister Andrea Willi. He said he had enjoyed his work in Bern and particularly valued his contacts with Swiss federal officials. After leaving the post, he stated he had planned to return to Austria.

In May 2001, shortly before leaving his post as ambassador to Switzerland, Wolfgang arranged a visit to Liechtenstein by the domestic editorial staff of the Neue Zürcher Zeitung and accompanied the journalists during their meetings with Prince Hans-Adam II, Prime Minister Otmar Hasler, and other government representatives.

Wolfgang left the post in late June 2001 and was succeeded by Prince Stefan of Liechtenstein.

=== Other activities ===
Wolfgang was a member of a panel documenting the history of the House of Liechtenstein and served on the board of the association of Liechtenstein Friends of Yad Vashem.

Wolfgang and his wife, Princess Gabrielle, visited the Bibliotheca Alexandrina in Alexandria, Egypt as dignitaries. They toured the library's exhibitions and museums and were accompanied during the visit by Peruvian ambassador César Castillo Ramírez.

In 2010, he was awarded the Grand Cross of the Order of Merit of the Principality by Prince Hans-Adam II for his services.

Wolfgang attended the 770th anniversary celebrations of Vranov in Moravia as an honorary guest in September 2010. He visited the town hall, and the crypt where members of the Liechtenstein family were buried. During the visit, he welcomed the establishment of diplomatic relations between Liechtenstein and the Czech Republic in 2009.

In October 2024, Wolfgang and Gabrielle visited the Czech town of Strání, where they toured the Květná 1794 glassworks and its museum. During the visit, Wolfgang learned about the glassworks which had been founded by his ancestor, Prince Alois I of Liechtenstein. They also visited the Church of the Exaltation of the Holy Cross and a historic hunting lodge associated with the royal family.

== Personal life ==
Wolfgang married Countess Gabrielle Basselet de La Rosée on 11 March 1970. She was born in Isareck in 1949, the daughter of Count Franz Basselet de La Rosée and Eleonore, née Princess Eleonore of Lobkowicz.

They have two children, Stephanie (born 1976) and Leopold (born 1978). The couple live in Styria and have also lived at a farm in Trahütten.

Prince Wolfgang of Liechtenstein House of Liechtenstein Born: 25 December 1934
Lines of succession
Preceded by Prince Karl	Line of succession to the Liechtensteiner throne 43th position	Succeeded by Prince Leopold
