= Bad Schwanberg =

- Municipality
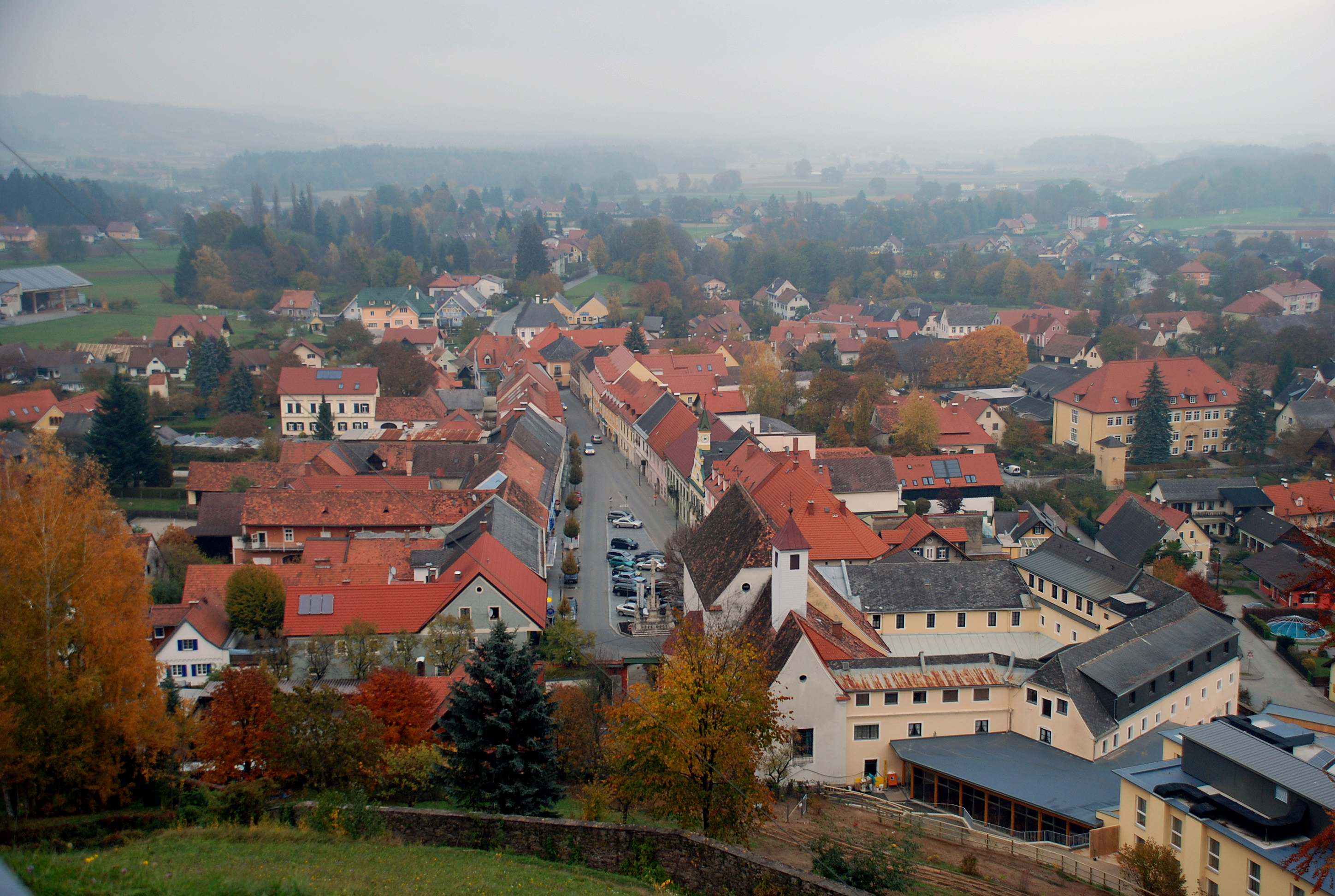
- Bad Schwanberg seen from the Church of Saint Joseph

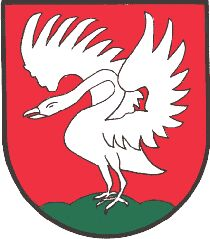
- Coat of arms

- Location within Austria
- Coordinates: 46°45′00″N 15°12′00″E
- Country: Austria
- State: Styria
- District: Deutschlandsberg
- Established: 2015-01-01

Government
  - Mayor: Mag. Karl-Heinz Schuster (ÖVP)

Area
  - Total: 124.25 km^{2} (47.97 sq mi)
- Elevation: 427 m (1,401 ft)

Population (2018-01-01)
  - Total: 4,566
  - Density: 36.75/km^{2} (95.18/sq mi)
- Time zone: UTC+1 (CET)
  - Summer (DST): UTC+2 (CEST)
- Postal code: 8541, 8530
- Area code: +43 3467, 3462
- Vehicle registration: DL
- Website: www.schwanberg.gv.at

Bad Schwanberg (German: [baːt ˈʃvaːnbɛɐk]; Slovene: Labodovec) is a market town in the Austrian state of Styria, in the district of Deutschlandsberg. It is situated on the eastern slopes of the Koralpe mountain range on the river Schwarze Sulm (Black Sulm), a major tributary of the river Sulm.

Schwanberg was expanded as part of the Styria municipal structural reform, at the end of 2014, by merging with the former municipalities Hollenegg, Gressenberg and Garanas, but continuing with the name "Schwanberg" until it was finally renamed "Bad Schwanberg", from 1 March 2020.

== People from Bad Schwanberg ==
- Wilhelm Gericke (1845-1925), conductor

== Population in town as of 2015 ==
Historical population
Year	Pop.	±%
1869	4,158	—
1880	4,462	+7.3%
1890	4,213	−5.6%
1900	4,405	+4.6%
1910	4,370	−0.8%
1923	4,432	+1.4%
1934	4,726	+6.6%
1939	4,580	−3.1%
1951	4,804	+4.9%
1961	4,670	−2.8%
1971	4,765	+2.0%
1981	4,854	+1.9%
1991	4,992	+2.8%
2001	5,008	+0.3%
2011	4,789	−4.4%
2021	4,520	−5.6%
