= Prince Heinrich of Liechtenstein =

Liechtensteiner prince (1877–1915)

Prince Heinrich
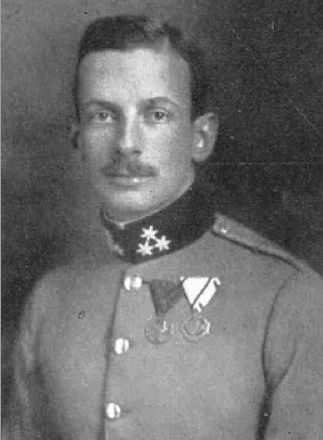
- Born: 21 June 1877; Hollenegg, Austria-Hungary
- Died: 16 August 1915 (aged 38); Warsaw, Russian Empire
Names
- Prince Heinrich Aloys Maria Joseph
- House: Liechtenstein
- Father: Prince Alfred of Liechtenstein
- Mother: Princess Henriette of Liechtenstein

Prince Heinrich of Liechtenstein (Prince Heinrich Aloys Maria Joseph; 21 June 1877 – 16 August 1915) was the fourth son of Prince Alfred of Liechtenstein and Princess Henriette of Liechtenstein and uncle of Franz Joseph II.

He was a member of the Austro-Hungarian Army and was killed in action in Warsaw on 16 August 1915 during the Russian Great Retreat. He is the highest member of the House of Liechtenstein to have been killed in action.

Prince Heinrich remained unmarried with no issue.
