= Prince Emanuel of Liechtenstein (1908–1987) =

Liechtensteiner prince

Prince Emanuel Louis
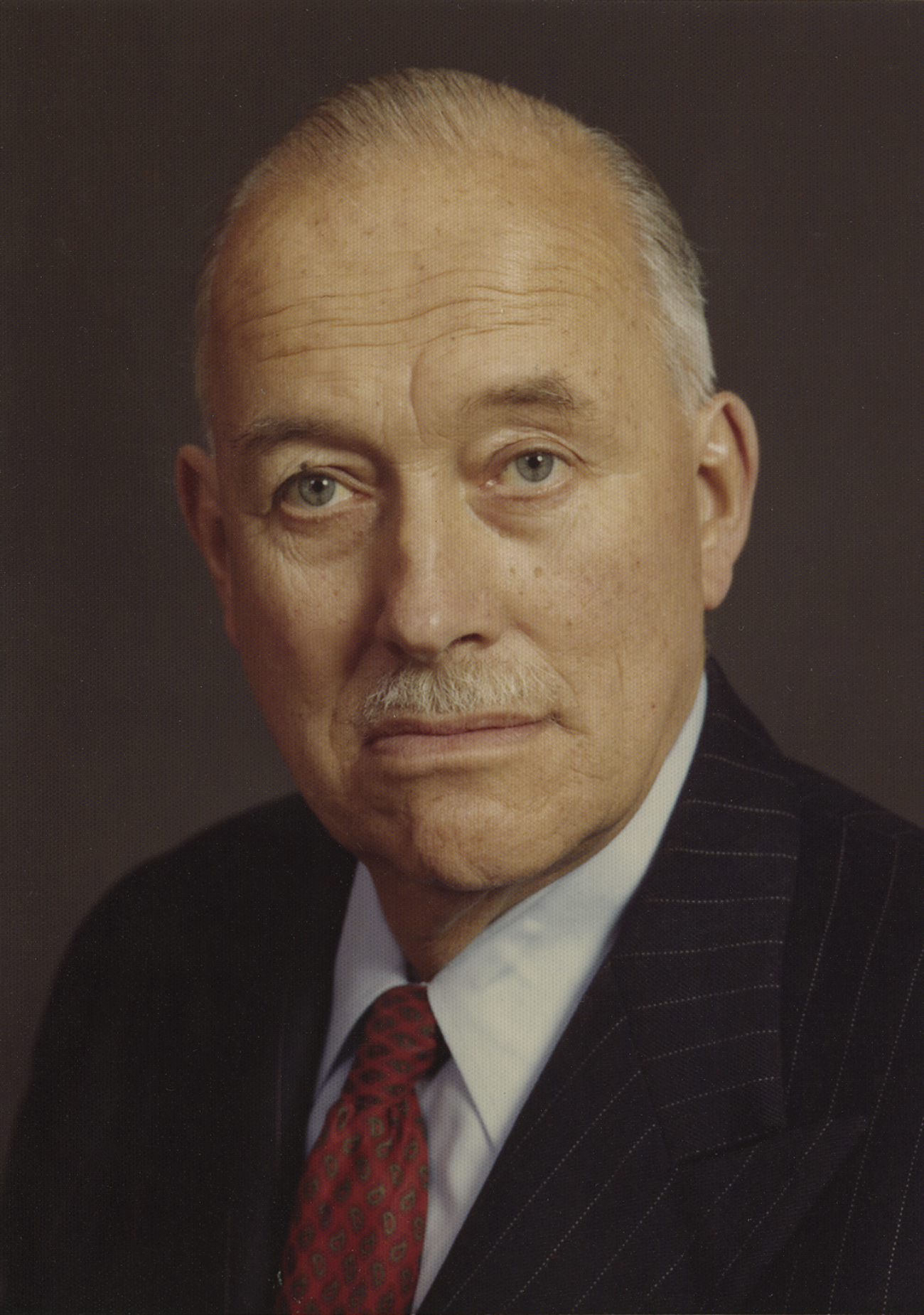
- Born: 22 October 1908; Betliar, Austria-Hungary
- Died: 18 October 1987 (aged 78); Grabs, Switzerland
Names
- Karl Emanuel Johannes Gabriel Maria Josef
- House: Liechtenstein
- Father: Prince Johannes of Liechtenstein
- Mother: Countess Mária Gabriella Andrássy de Csíkszentkirály et Krasznahorka

Karl Emanuel Johannes Gabriel Maria Josef, Prinz von und zu Liechtenstein (22 October 1908 in Betliar/Betlér – 18 October 1987 in Grabs) was a member of the sovereign family of Liechtenstein. He was a child of Prince Johannes of Liechtenstein (1873–1959) and Countess Marie Gabrielle Andrássy von Csik-Szent-Király und Kraszna-Horka (1886–1961).

His paternal grandparents were Prince Alfred of Liechtenstein (1842–1907) and Princess Henriette of Liechtenstein (1843–1931), and his maternal grandparents were Count Géza Andrássy von Csik-Szent-Király und Kraszna-Horka (1856–1938) and Countess Eleonore von Kaunitz (1862–1936).

He was general manager and president of administrative board of Loma Joint stock company.

He died unmarried and without issue.

== Scouting ==
Prince Emanuel joined the Scout Movement in 1933. He participated in the 4th World Scout Jamboree in Gödöllő. He served as Chief Scout (German: Korpsführer) of Fürstlich Liechtensteinische Pfadfinderkorps St. Georg from 1935 to 1971. In 1971 he became Honorary Chief Scout (German: Ehrenkorpsführer).

During World War II he kept contact with the "Badener Ring". The "Badener Ring" was a secret group of Scouts and Scouters from Austria and the Netherlands, located in Austria. This group had contacts to French POW Rover Scouts and to Scouters all over Austria. He delivered foreign Scouting magazines to them. He also informed Austrian Scouts about the death of Baden-Powell in 1941. Prince Emanuel was Contingent Leader of Liechtenstein at the 7th World Scout Jamboree in Bad Ischl.

In 1956 Prince Emanuel together with Austrian Student Rover Scouts (German: Burse) from Vienna helped refugees after the Hungarian Revolution of 1956. He also met Franz Pospisil, Chief Scout of Austria, several times. In 1958 he invited the Viennese Scout groups 56 and 57 to Liechtenstein. So their first summer camp in a foreign country took place in Vaduz. There they took part in his birthday celebration. In 1961 he gave the permission to bear the name "Liechtenstein" to the Viennese Scout group 21. He was awarded with one of the highest honour of Austrian Scouting the Silbernen Steinbock.

In 1969 he refounded the Scout group in Balzers, which is still active today.

He was Group Scout Master of the Scout group of Triesen from 1974 to 1987. He supported this Scout group for long years.

He died on October 18, 1987. Scouts from all Scout groups of Liechtenstein took part in his funeral. He is buried at graveyard of Gamprin-Bendern.
