= Constantin von Liechtenstein =

Liechtenstein prince and Olympic alpine skier

Prince Constantin
- Born: 23 December 1911; Vienna, Austria-Hungary
- Died: 28 March 2001 (aged 89); Grabs, Switzerland
- Burial: St. Florian Cathedral, Vaduz, Liechtenstein
- Spouse: Maria Elisabeth von Leutzendorff (m. 1941; died 1944) Countess Ilona Mária Esterházy von Galántha (m. 1976)
- Issue: Princess Monica Maria Theresia Elisabeth of Liechtenstein
Names
- Constantin Franz Nikolaus Karl Heinrich Dagobert Anton von Padua Ildefons Maria
- House: Liechtenstein
- Father: Prince Johannes of Liechtenstein
- Mother: Countess Mária Gabriella Andrássy de Csíkszentkirály et Krasznahorka

Prince Constantin Franz Nikolaus Karl Heinrich Dagobert Anton von Padua Ildefons Maria von Liechtenstein (23 December 1911 – 28 March 2001) was a Liechtensteiner prince and alpine skier who competed in the 1948 Winter Olympics.

He was born in Vienna, Austria and died in Grabs, Switzerland.

In 1948 he finished 99th in the alpine skiing downhill event.

He married firstly (morganatically) in Vienna civilly on 18 March 1941 and religiously on 19 March 1941 Maria Elisabeth von Leutzendorff (Branky, 23 May 1921 – killed in an air raid in World War II in Vienna, 10 September 1944), and had issue, and married secondly in Vaduz civilly on 21 December 1976 and religiously on 10 January 1977 Countess Ilona Mária Esterházy von Galántha (Sárosd, 17 May 1921 – 2 August 2019), without issue:

- Princess Monica Maria Theresia Elisabeth (b. Vienna, 8 April 1942), married in Rio de Janeiro on 25 November 1960, and divorced in 1969, as his first wife André Francisco Jordan, né Andrzej Franciszek Spitzman Jordan (b. Lviv, 10 September 1933), a businessman and real estate magnate, cofounder of the city of Vilamoura, in the Algarve, Southern Portugal, son of Henryk Alfred Spitzman Jordan and first wife, Faustyna Joanna Szerman, both of Polish Jewish descent, and had issue:
  - Gilberto Frederico Jordan (b. Rio de Janeiro, 28 August 1961), married to María José Amich y Clavell (b. Barcelona, 7 February 1966). They have issue:
    - Camila Sofia Amich Jordan (b. Lisbon, 2 September 1989)
    - Victoria Luisa Amich Jordan (b. Lisbon, 5 September 1996)
    - Sofia Ines Amich Jordan (b. Lisbon, 7 February 2000)
    - André Javier Amich Jordan (b. Lisbon, 23 February 2005)
  - Constantino Pedro Jordan (b. Buenos Aires, 7 September 1964), married on 7 May 1994, and divorced in January 2020, to Maria Manuela Saias Coelho (b. Olhão, 17 November 1965). They have issue:
    - Francisco Constantino Saias Coelho Jordan (b. Lisbon, 10 March 2000)
    - Maria Carlota Saias Coelho Jordan (b. Lisbon, 30 April 2002)
