= Garanas =

- Former municipality
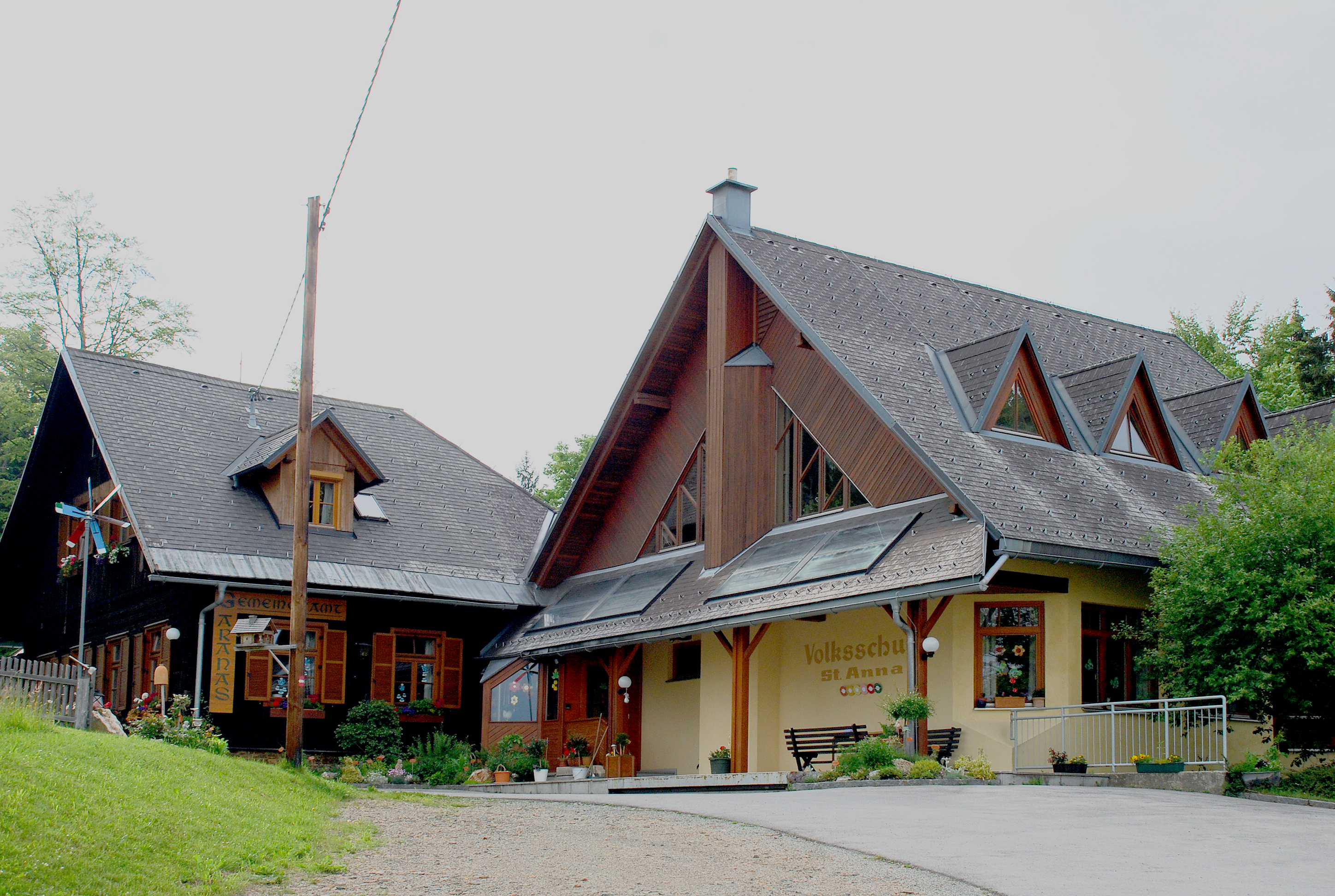
- Garanas town hall and school

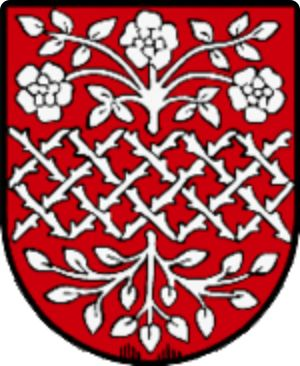
- Coat of arms

- Location within Austria
- Coordinates: 46°46′00″N 15°08′00″E
- Country: Austria
- State: Styria
- District: Deutschlandsberg

Area
  - Total: 59.9 km^{2} (23.1 sq mi)
- Elevation: 900 m (3,000 ft)

Population (1 January 2016)
  - Total: 270
  - Density: 4.5/km^{2} (12/sq mi)
- Time zone: UTC+1 (CET)
  - Summer (DST): UTC+2 (CEST)
- Postal code: 8530, 8541
- Area code: 03467
- Vehicle registration: DL

Garanas is a former municipality in the district of Deutschlandsberg in the Austrian state of Styria. Since the 2015 Styria municipal structural reform, it is part of the municipality Schwanberg.

== Population ==
Historical population
Year	Pop.	±%
1869	649	—
1880	798	+23.0%
1890	671	−15.9%
1900	637	−5.1%
1910	555	−12.9%
1923	502	−9.5%
1934	594	+18.3%
1939	547	−7.9%
1951	511	−6.6%
1961	479	−6.3%
1971	411	−14.2%
1981	339	−17.5%
1991	332	−2.1%
2001	300	−9.6%
2011	275	−8.3%
