= Gressenberg =

- Former municipality
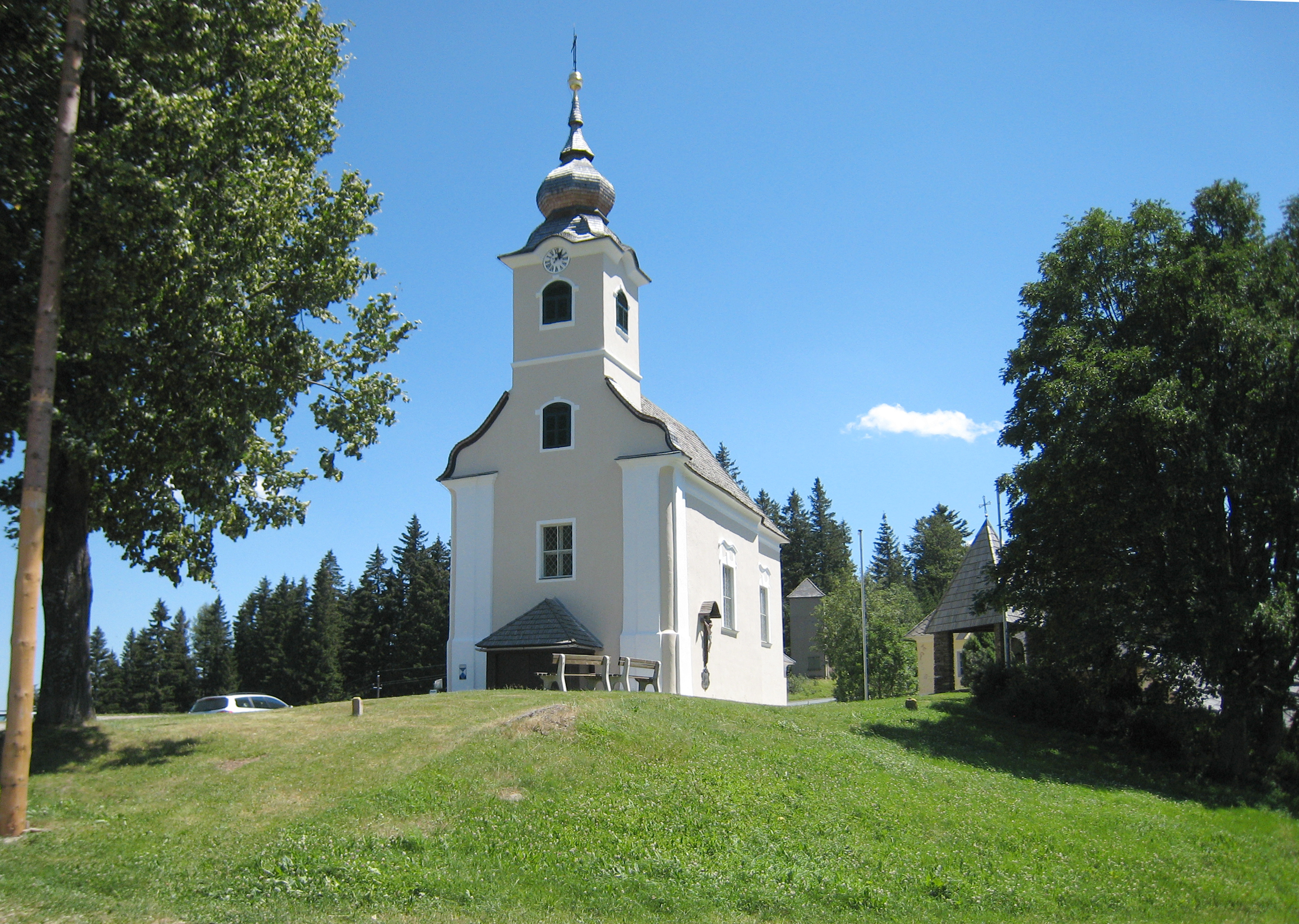
- Glashütten parish church

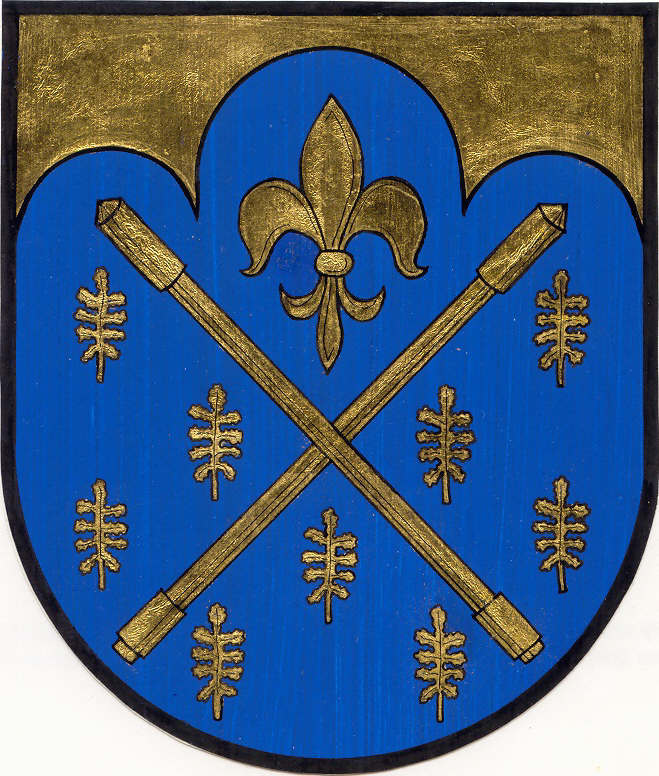
- Coat of arms

- Location within Austria
- Coordinates: 46°48′00″N 15°07′00″E
- Country: Austria
- State: Styria
- District: Deutschlandsberg

Area
  - Total: 34.78 km^{2} (13.43 sq mi)
- Elevation: 1,247 m (4,091 ft)

Population (2014-12-31)
  - Total: 283
  - Density: 8.14/km^{2} (21.1/sq mi)
- Time zone: UTC+1 (CET)
  - Summer (DST): UTC+2 (CEST)
- Postal code: 8541
- Area code: 03467
- Vehicle registration: DL
- Website: www.bergdorf-glashuetten.at/gressenberg

Gressenberg is an area of western Styria, Austria. Until 2014, Gressenberg was a municipality in the district of Deutschlandsberg in the Austrian state of Styria. Since the 2015 Styria municipal structural reform, it is part of the municipality Schwanberg.

== Population ==
Historical population
Year	Pop.	±%
1869	745	—
1880	710	−4.7%
1890	659	−7.2%
1900	626	−5.0%
1910	605	−3.4%
1923	603	−0.3%
1934	701	+16.3%
1939	680	−3.0%
1951	621	−8.7%
1961	561	−9.7%
1971	489	−12.8%
1981	405	−17.2%
1991	379	−6.4%
2001	352	−7.1%
2011	318	−9.7%
2014	283	−11.0%
