= Wilhelm Gericke =

Austrian-born conductor and composer

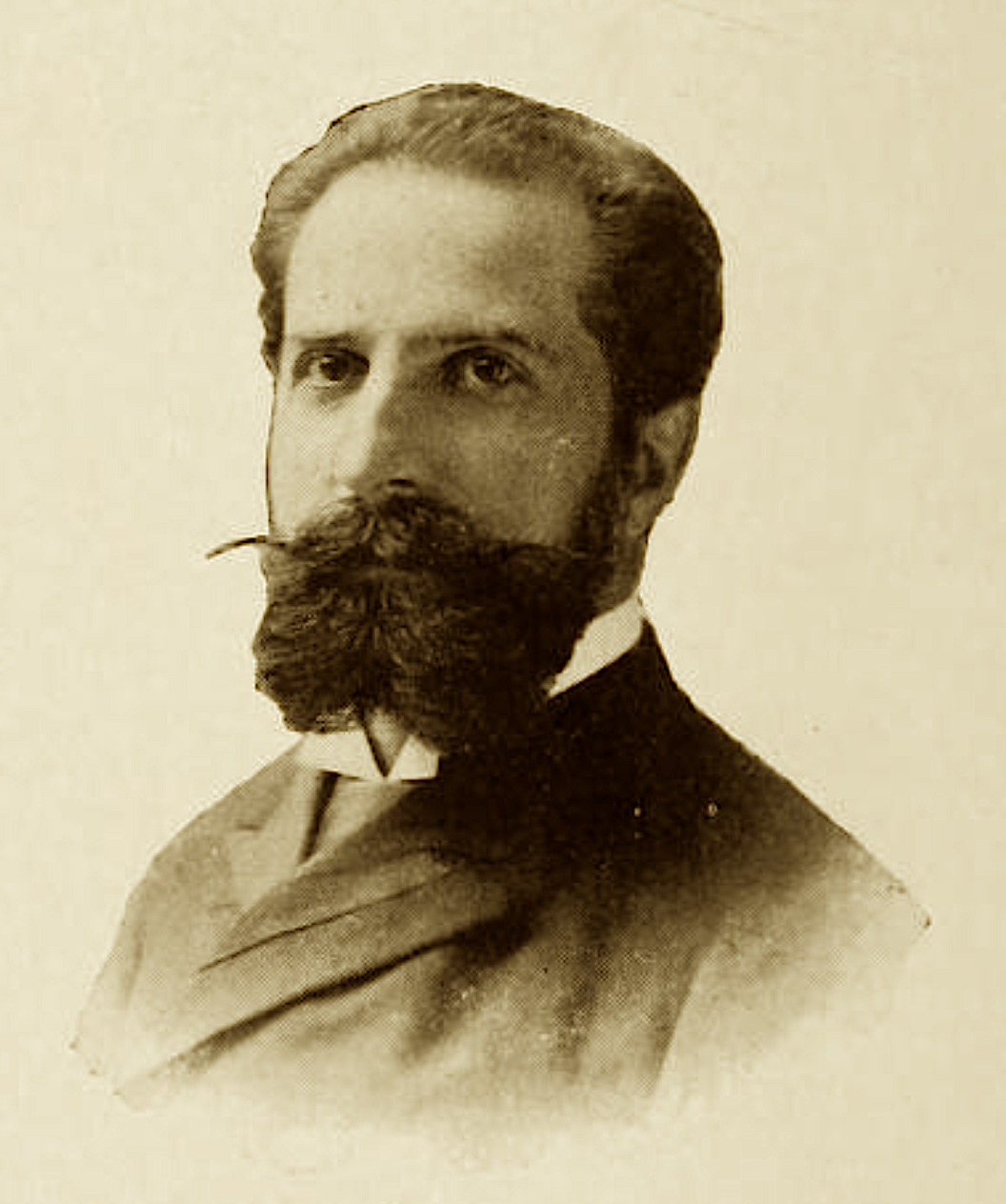
- Born: April 18, 1845; Schwanberg, Austrian Empire
- Died: October 27, 1925 (aged 80); Vienna
- Occupation: Conductor

Wilhelm Gericke, also known as William Gericke, (April 18, 1845 – October 27, 1925) was an Austrian-born conductor and composer who worked in Vienna and Boston.

He was born in Schwanberg, Austria. Initially he trained in Graz to be a schoolmaster. He was unsuccessful, although he did get a position playing violin in a theatre orchestra. In 1862 he entered the Vienna Conservatory, where he studied under Dessoff. Leaving the conservatory in 1865, he became kapellmeister of the theatre at Linz, directing opera there and in Vienna. In 1874, he became second kapellmeister and chorus master at the Vienna Court Opera, where his lifelong friend Hans Richter was first kapellmeister. There he gave the Viennese premiere of Richard Wagner's Tannhäuser. He also made a name for himself producing French and Italian operas. On the retirement of Brahms from the conductorship of the Vienna Society (German: Wiener Gesellschaft der Musikfreunde) concerts (German: Gesellschaftskonzerte) in 1880, Gericke succeeded him, and also became the conductor of its choral society (German: Singverein).

His fame as a conductor, and particularly as a drillmaster, induced Henry Lee Higginson of the Boston Symphony Orchestra (BSO) to secure him as its leader after attending one of Gericke's concerts in Vienna. He spent two periods in the United States conducting the BSO, 1884–1889 and 1898–1906. During his first stay, he eliminated the lighter music that his predecessor had allowed in the programs, scheduled extra rehearsal time, and hired more foreign musicians. The orchestra improved noticeably in the quality of its playing.

In 1884, he was made an honorary member of the Gesellschaft der Musikfreunde in Wien. In 1889, for health reasons, he returned to Vienna, and to the leadership of the Gesellschaftsconcerte, but resigned again in 1895. He and the BSO parted company amicably in 1906 due to the BSO's failure to meet his expectations for a new contract. He died in Vienna.

== Works ==
He published a number of works for orchestra, also pianoforte works, and some chamber music. Among his works are:

- Maiglöckchen (May bells)
- Muntrer Bach, was rauscht du so? (Merry brook, what stirs you so?)
- Wach auf, du schöne Träumerin (Wake up, beautiful dreamer)
