= Prince Alois of Liechtenstein (1869–1955) =

Liechtensteiner prince (1869–1955)

Prince Alois
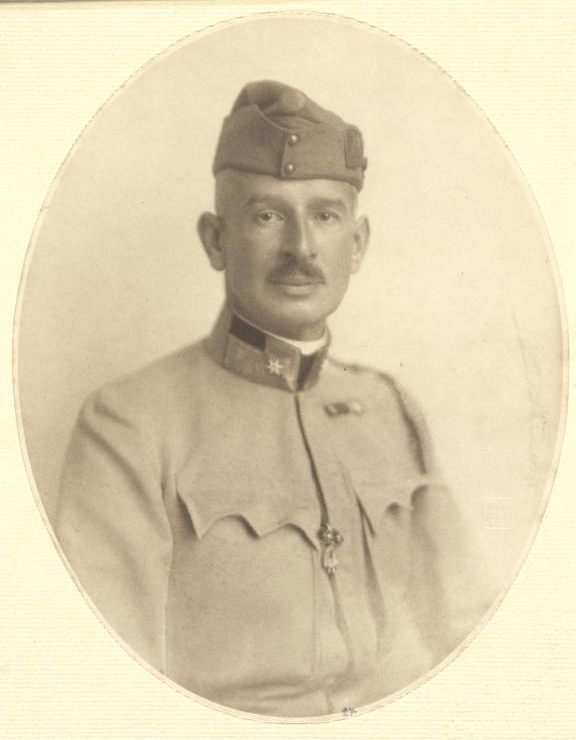
- Prince Alois c. 1910
- Born: 17 June 1869; Hollenegg, Austria-Hungary
- Died: 16 March 1955 (aged 85); Vaduz, Liechtenstein
- Burial: St. Florian Cathedral
- Spouse: Archduchess Elisabeth Amalie of Austria (m. 1903)
- Issue: Franz Joseph II, Prince of Liechtenstein; Princess Marie Therese; Prince Karl Alfred; Prince Georg Hartmann; Prince Ulrich; Princess Maria Henriette; Prince Alois; Prince Heinrich
Names
- Alois Gonzaga Maria Adolf
- House: Liechtenstein
- Father: Prince Alfred of Liechtenstein
- Mother: Princess Henriette of Liechtenstein

Prince Alois of Liechtenstein (Alois Gonzaga Maria Adolf; 17 June 1869 – 16 March 1955) was the son of Prince Alfred of Liechtenstein and Princess Henriette of Liechtenstein, daughter of Alois II of Liechtenstein.

== Life ==
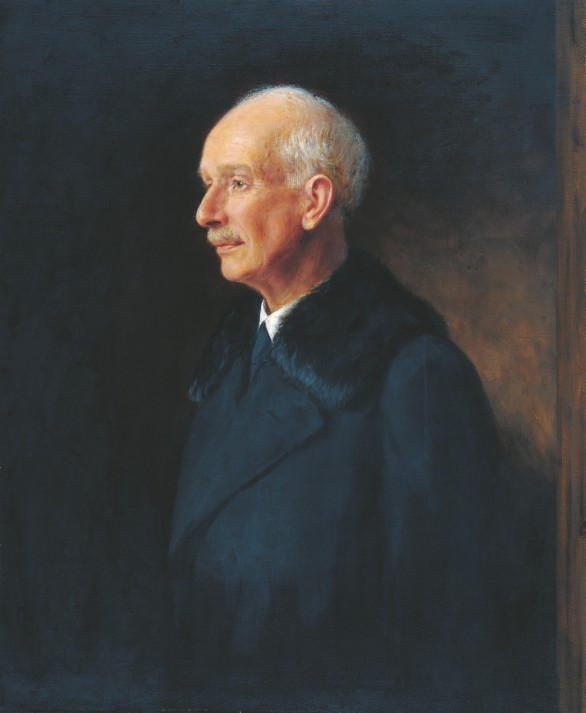
Portrait of Prince Alois by Edith von Czizek-Stengel, 1942

The maternal nephew and first cousin once removed of Franz I, Prince of Liechtenstein, Prince Alois renounced his rights to the succession on 26 February 1923 in favor of his son Franz Joseph II, as he was concerned about his age should he assume the role; he was 53 when he renounced his right to succession and would have been 68 when he assumed the throne.

He was the 1,177th Knight of the Order of the Golden Fleece in Austria.

Alois died on 16 March 1955 at the age of 85 years old in Vaduz.

== Marriage and issue ==
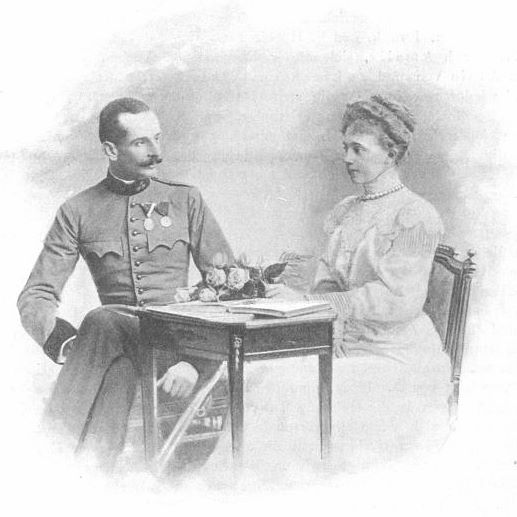
Prince Alois with his wife Elisabeth Amalie (Sport & Salon, Vienna, 25 April 1903).

On 20 April 1903, in Vienna, he married Archduchess Elisabeth Amalie of Austria (7 July 1878, in Reichenau – 13 March 1960, in Vaduz). They had eight children together:

- Franz Josef II, Prince of Liechtenstein (16 August 1906 – 13 November 1989), married in 1943 to Countess Georgina of Wilczek and had issue, including Hans-Adam II.
- Princess Marie Therese Henriette Aloisia Alfreda Franziska Josepha Julie Adelheid Margarete Annunziata Elisabeth Ignatia Benedikta (14 January 1908, in Vienna – 30 September 1973, in Funchal, Madeira), married in 1944 to Count Artur Strachwitz von Gross-Zauche und Camminetz and had issue.
- Prince Karl Alfred Maria Johannes Baptista Heinrich Alois Georg Hartmann Ignatius Benediktus Franz Joseph Rochus (16 August 1910, in Schloss Frauenthal – 17 November 1985, in Hainburg an der Donau), married at Schloss Persenbeug on 17 February 1949 Archduchess Agnes Christina of Austria. They had seven children.
- Prince Georg Hartmann Maria Josef Franz de Paula Alois Ignatius Benediktus Martin (11 November 1911 – 18 January 1998), married Duchess Marie Christine of Württemberg (daughter of Philipp Albrecht, Duke of Württemberg) in 1948 and had seven children.
- Prince Ulrich Dietmar Maria Franz Ferdinand Karl Alois Joseph Ignatius Benediktus Johannes Augustinus (29 August 1913, in Gross-Ullersdorf – 13 October 1978, in Meran), unmarried and without issue.
- Princess Maria Henriette Theresia Aloisa Franziska Sophie Josepha Michaela Adelheid Annunziata Elisabeth Ignatia Benedikta et omnes sancti (6 November 1914, in Vienna – 13 October 2011), married in 1943 to Peter Graf von Eltz genannt Faust von Stromberg and had issue.
- Prince Alois Heinrich Maria Franz Joseph Ferdinand Ignatius Benediktus Liberatus Marko d'Aviano (20 November 1917, in Vienna – 14 February 1967, in Kalwang, Styria), unmarried and without issue.
- Prince Heinrich Hartneid Maria Franz de Paula Johann Alois Joseph Ignatius Benedictus Hilarion (1 October 1920, in Gross-Ullersdorf – 29 November 1993, in Grabs), married in 1968 to Amalie Gräfin von Podstatzky-Lichtenstein and had three children.
