= Burg Deutschlandsberg =

Castle in Styria, Austria

- Styria, Austria
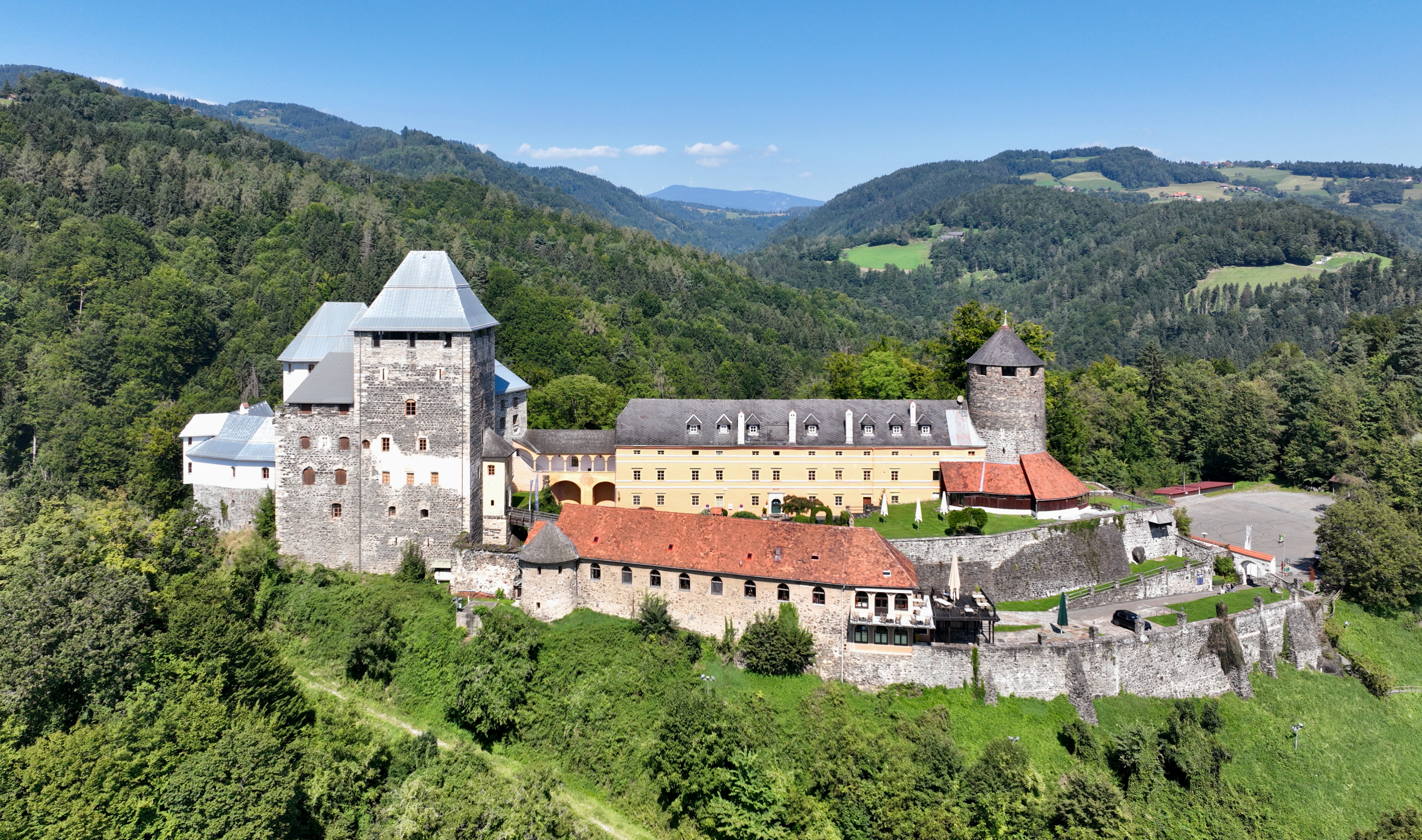
- Deutschlandsberg Castle

Site information
- Type: Rock castle

Location
- Coordinates: 46°48′48″N 15°11′48″E
- Height: 1,306 ft

Site history
- Built: 12th century

Burg Deutschlandsberg is a castle in Styria, Austria. Burg Deutschlandsberg is 398 metres (1,306 ft) above sea level.

== See also ==
- List of castles in Austria
