= Frauenthal Castle =

Coordinates: 46°48′49″N 15°14′40″E

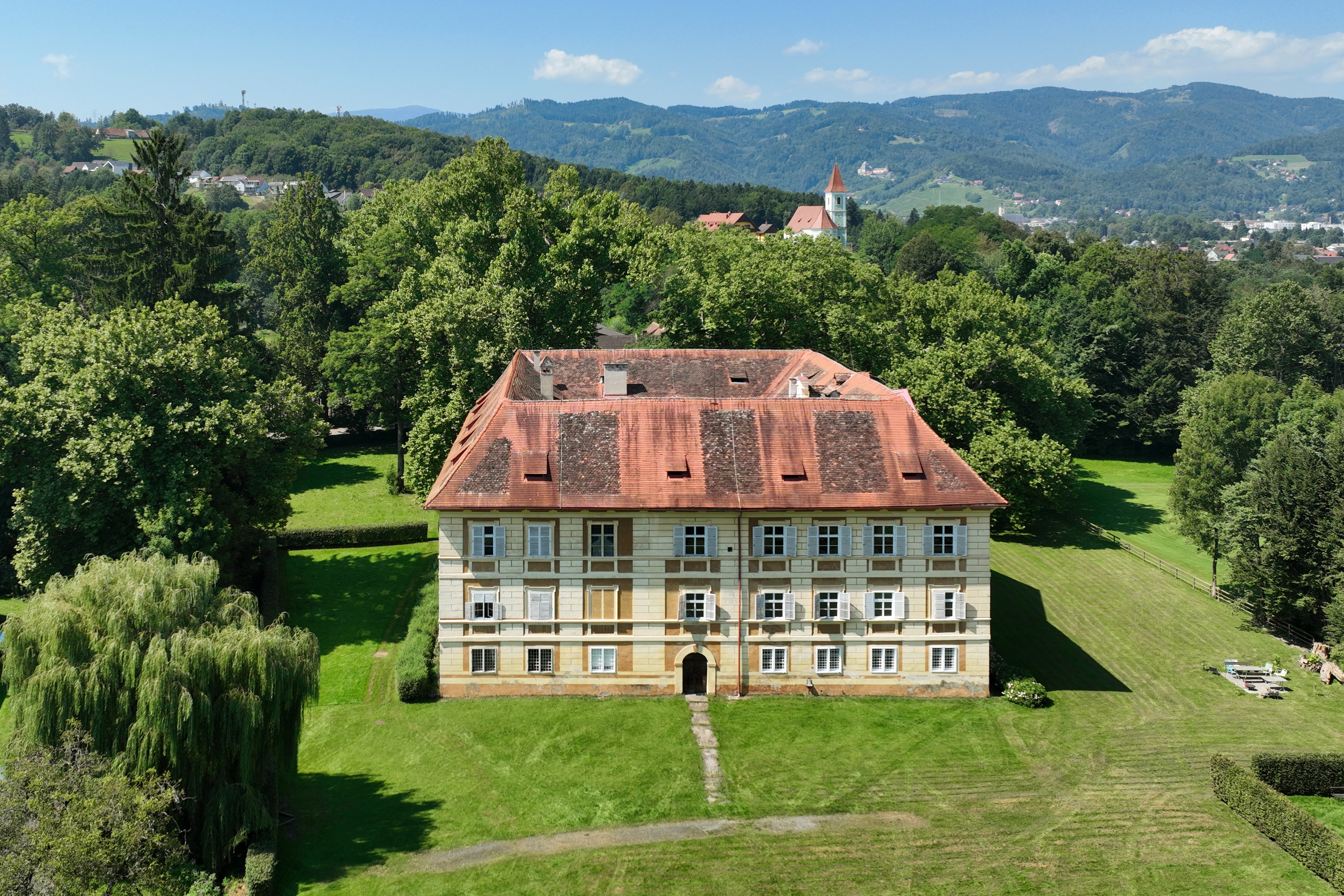
Frauenthal castle in August 2023

Frauenthal Castle is an historic building in Frauental an der Laßnitz in the district of Deutschlandsberg in Styria. Its history goes back to the 16th century. These days it is owned by the House of Liechtenstein and used as a high school.

== History ==
1542 the castle was built as a residence for aristocrats and extended in 1675. Originally it was named after Saint Ulrich. The castle chapel is named after Saint Joseph. From 1812 to 1820 it saw its economic high under the owner Moritz von Fries. 1820 the ownership was transferred to the House of Liechtenstein. In 1969 and 1970 it was renovated.
