= Deutschlandsberg =

- Municipality
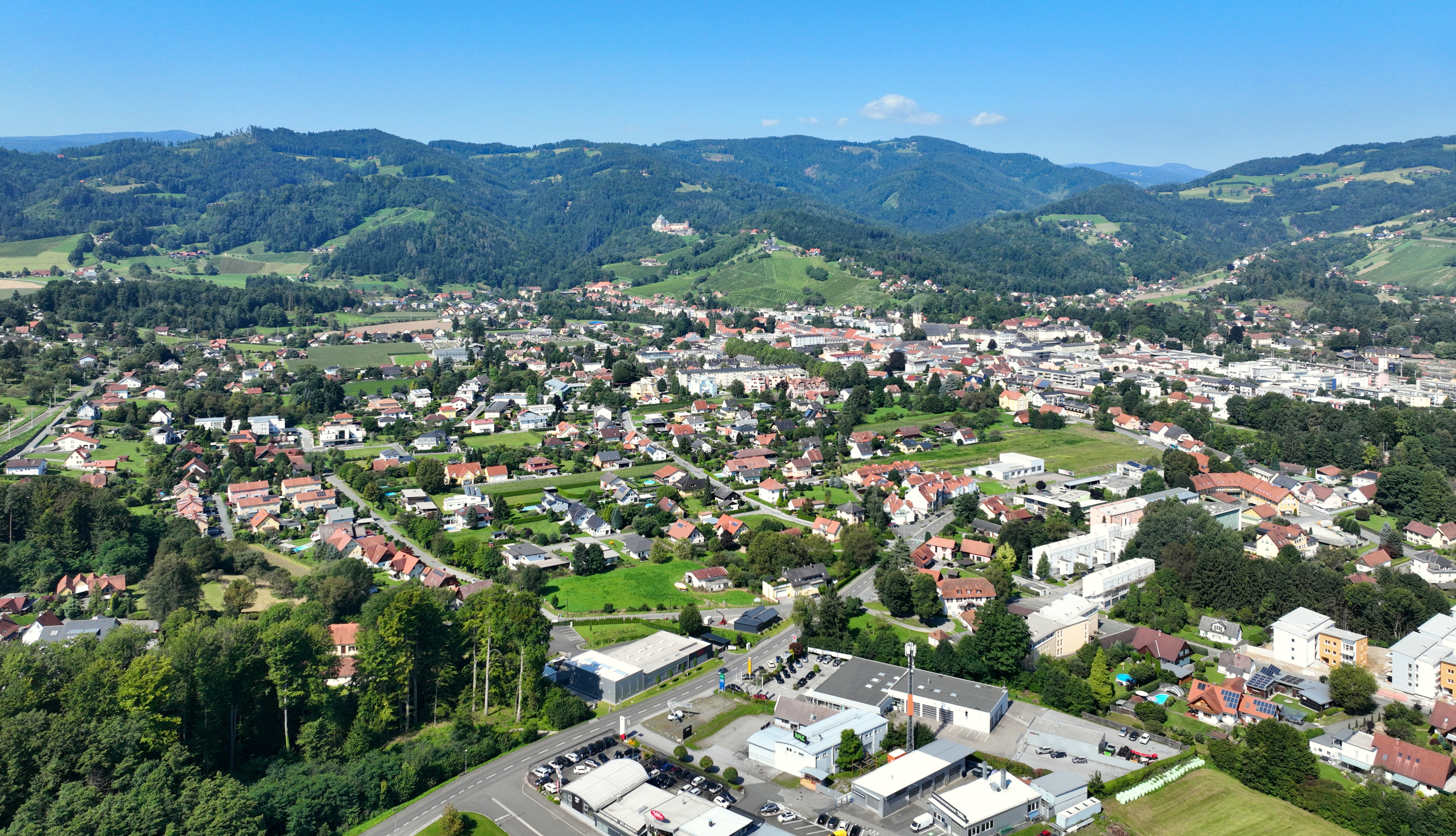
- Deutschlandsberg

- Coat of arms

- Location within Austria
- Coordinates: 46°48′58″N 15°12′54″E
- Country: Austria
- State: Styria
- District: Deutschlandsberg

Government
  - Mayor: Josef Wallner (SPÖ)

Area
  - Total: 179.06 km^{2} (69.14 sq mi)
- Elevation: 372 m (1,220 ft)

Population (2023-01-01)
  - Total: 11,721
  - Density: 65.459/km^{2} (169.54/sq mi)
- Time zone: UTC+1 (CET)
  - Summer (DST): UTC+2 (CEST)
- Postal code: 8530
- Area code: 03462
- Vehicle registration: DL
- Website: www.deutschlandsberg.at

Deutschlandsberg (German: [dɔʏtʃˈlantsbɛʁk]; Slovene: Lonč) is a town in Deutschlandsberg district of Styria, Austria. It is located in southern Austria, near the border with Slovenia. It is approximately 35 km from Graz. Popular tourist attractions include the Deutschlandsberg Castle.

== Population ==
Historical population
Year	Pop.	±%
1869	3,008	—
1880	3,938	+30.9%
1890	4,462	+13.3%
1900	4,833	+8.3%
1910	5,132	+6.2%
1923	5,078	−1.1%
1934	5,389	+6.1%
1939	3,493	−35.2%
1951	6,720	+92.4%
1961	6,693	−0.4%
1971	7,295	+9.0%
1981	7,620	+4.5%
1991	7,760	+1.8%
2001	7,983	+2.9%
2011	8,136	+1.9%
2021	11,623	+42.9%
