= Hollenegg =

- Former municipality
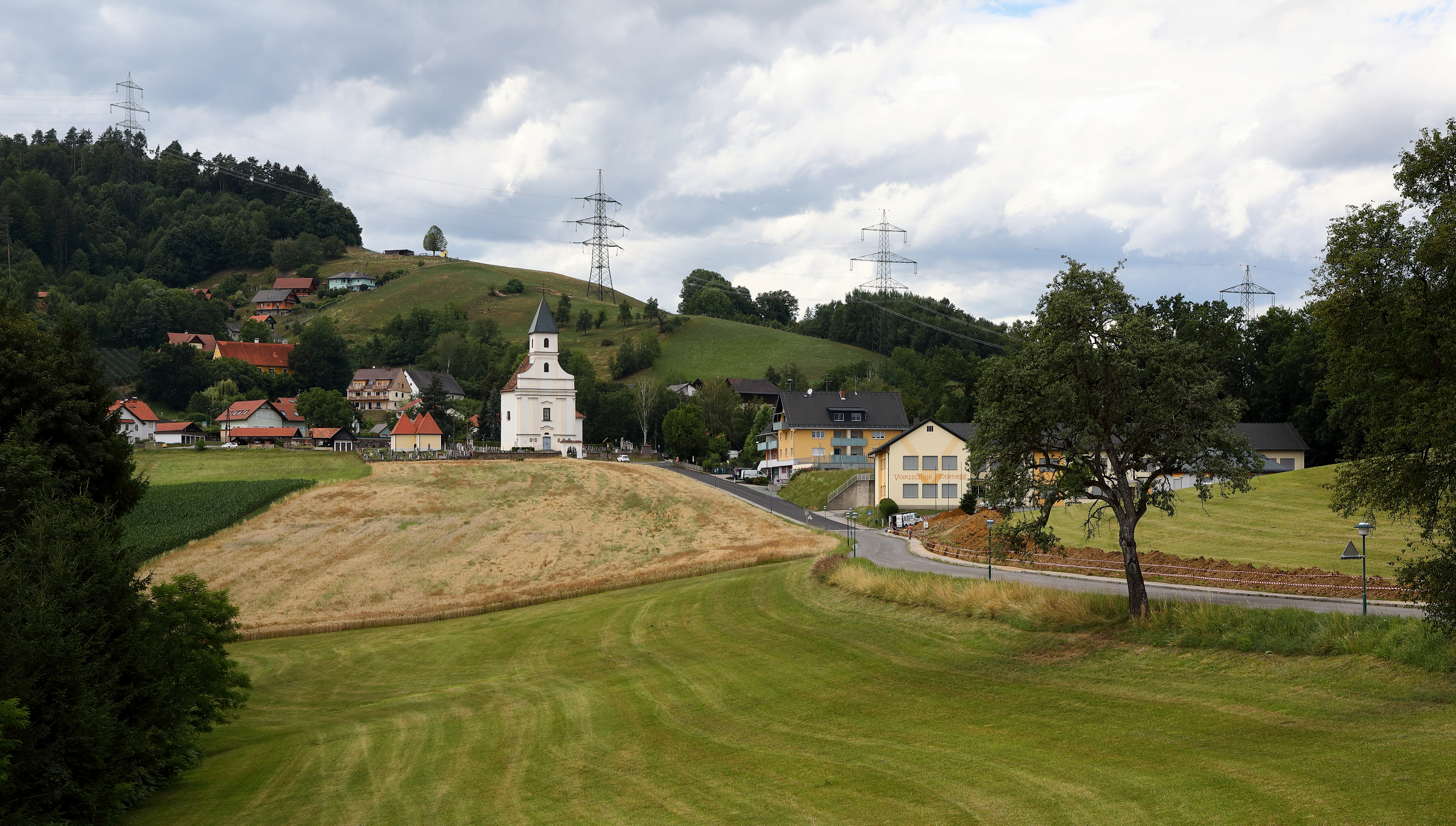
- Hollenegg

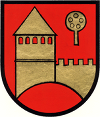
- Coat of arms

- Location within Austria
- Coordinates: 46°47′29″N 15°12′48″E
- Country: Austria
- State: Styria
- District: Deutschlandsberg

Area
  - Total: 17.58 km^{2} (6.79 sq mi)
- Elevation: 350–780 m (1,150–2,560 ft)

Population (1 January 2016)
  - Total: 2,077
  - Density: 118.1/km^{2} (306.0/sq mi)
- Time zone: UTC+1 (CET)
  - Summer (DST): UTC+2 (CEST)
- Postal code: 8530, 8541
- Area code: 03462, 03467
- Vehicle registration: DL
- Website: www.hollenegg. steiermark.at

Hollenegg is a former municipality in the district of Deutschlandsberg in the Austrian state of Styria. Since the 2015 Styria municipal structural reform, it is part of the municipality Schwanberg.

== Population ==
Historical population
Year	Pop.	±%
1869	1,241	—
1880	1,348	+8.6%
1890	1,450	+7.6%
1900	1,444	−0.4%
1910	1,493	+3.4%
1923	1,530	+2.5%
1934	1,537	+0.5%
1939	1,558	+1.4%
1951	1,685	+8.2%
1961	1,786	+6.0%
1971	1,919	+7.4%
1981	2,026	+5.6%
1991	2,146	+5.9%
2001	2,259	+5.3%
2011	2,140	−5.3%
