= Eugene Jean, Count of Soissons =

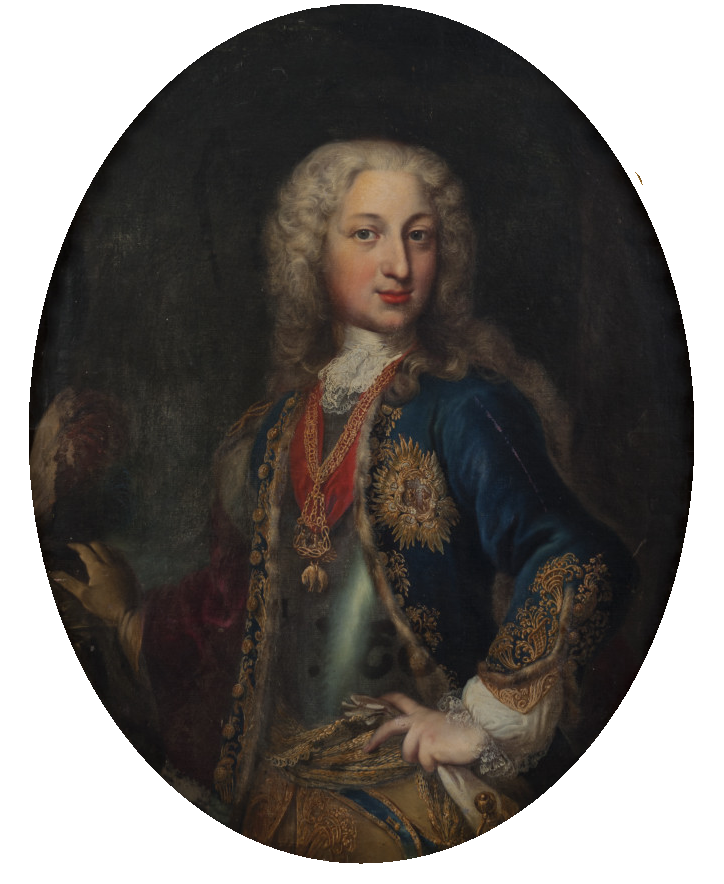
- Portrait by Maria Giovanna Clementi, 1725–1734

4th Count of Soissons
- Coat of arms
- Tenure: 28 December 1729 — 24 November 1734
- Predecessor: Emmanuel Thomas
- Successor: Title extinct
- Full name: French: Eugène-Jean-François de Savoie-Carignan; Italian: Eugenio Giovanni Francesco di Savoia-Soissons
- Titles: Duke of Troppau (jure matris)
- Born: September 23, 1714; Vienna
- Died: November 24, 1734 (aged 20); Mannheim
- Noble family: Savoy-Soissons; Savoy-Carignano
- Father: Thomas Emmanuel, Prince of Savoy-Carignan
- Mother: Princess Maria Theresia of Liechtenstein, Duchess of Troppau

Prince Eugene Jean of Savoy (Eugene Jean François; 23 September 1714 – 23 November 1734) was the last Count of Soissons and by birth a member of the House of Savoy.

== Life ==
The only son of Emmanuel Thomas, Count of Soissons (a member of the House of Savoy-Carignano), and Princess Maria Theresia of Liechtenstein, Duchess of Troppau, he succeeded his father on his death in 1729, while remaining his mother's heir apparent and being often also styled "Duke of Troppau".

In the same year 1729, the King of Sardinia Victor Amadeus II granted him the title of knight of the Supreme Order of the Most Holy Annunciation, the highest Savoy distinction.

In 1731, at the instigation of his grand-uncle, Prince Eugene of Savoy, a famous general and eminent personality in the imperial court, he was made, like his father before him, knight of the Order of the Golden Fleece by the Emperor Charles VI.

With the aim of establishing a second Savoy state in central Italy, Prince Eugene of Savoy, particularly attached to his grand-nephew, who was his last living male heir, requested for him the hand of Maria Teresa Cybo-Malaspina, Duchess of Massa and Princess of Carrara, obtaining the approval of Emperor Charles VI and the King of Sardinia, Charles Emmanuel III, whom he looked to as the head of the extended House of Savoy. The duchess was then only seven years old and was under the regency of her mother Ricciarda Gonzaga di Novellara. Matrimonial agreements were signed in Vienna, where the prince resided, on 2 May 1732, and, in the month of October, the eighteen-year-old betrothed visited Massa to pay homage to his little fiancée and future mother-in-law. The marriage, however, could not take place due to the young count's premature death in Mannheim, where he was serving the emperor in the military, on 23 November 1734. Maria Teresa would later be married to Ercole Rinaldo d'Este, heir of the duchy of Modena and Reggio (and future duke under the name Ercole III).

With Eugene Jean's death, the title "Count of Soissons" became extinct and reverted to the French crown. The huge inheritance of Prince Eugene, who died intestate two years later, fell to his closest surviving relative, Eugene Jean's aunt, Anna Victoria of Savoy. In 1772, upon the death of Eugene Jean's mother, the duchy of Troppau returned to the possession of the princes of Liechtenstein, in the person of Franz Joseph I.

== Ancestry ==
Ancestors of Eugene Jean, Count of Soissons

16. Thomas Francis, Prince of Carignano
8. Eugene Maurice, Count of Soissons
17. Marie de Bourbon
4. Louis Thomas, Count of Soissons
18. Lorenzo Mancini
9. Olympia Mancini
19. Girolama Mazzarini
2. Emmanuel Thomas, Count of Soissons
20. Charles de La Cropte, Lord of Chanteirac
10. François Paul de La Cropte, Lord of Beauvais
21. Isabeau d'Auzaneau
5. Uranie de La Cropte de Beauvais
22. Gédéon Martel
11. Charlotte Martel
23. Élisabeth de La Mothe-Fouqué
1. Eugene Jean of Savoy, Count of Soissons
24. Karl I, Prince of Liechtenstein
12. Karl Eusebius, Prince of Liechtenstein
25. Anna Marie Šemberová of Boskovic and Černá Hora
6. Hans-Adam I, Prince of Liechtenstein
26. Maximilian, Prince of Dietrichstein
13. Countess Johanna Beatrix of Dietrichstein
27. Princess Anna Marie of Liechtenstein
3. Princess Maria Theresia of Liechtenstein
28. Maximilian, Prince of Dietrichstein (= 26)
14. Ferdinand Joseph, Prince of Dietrichstein
29. Princess Anna Maria of Liechtenstein (= 27)
7. Princess Edmunda of Dietrichstein-Nikolsburg
30. Johann Anton I, Prince of Eggenberg
15. Countess Maria Elisabeth of Eggenberg
31. Margravine Maria Anna of Brandenburg-Bayreuth
