= Ezéchiel du Mas, Comte de Mélac =

French war minister (c. 1630–1704)

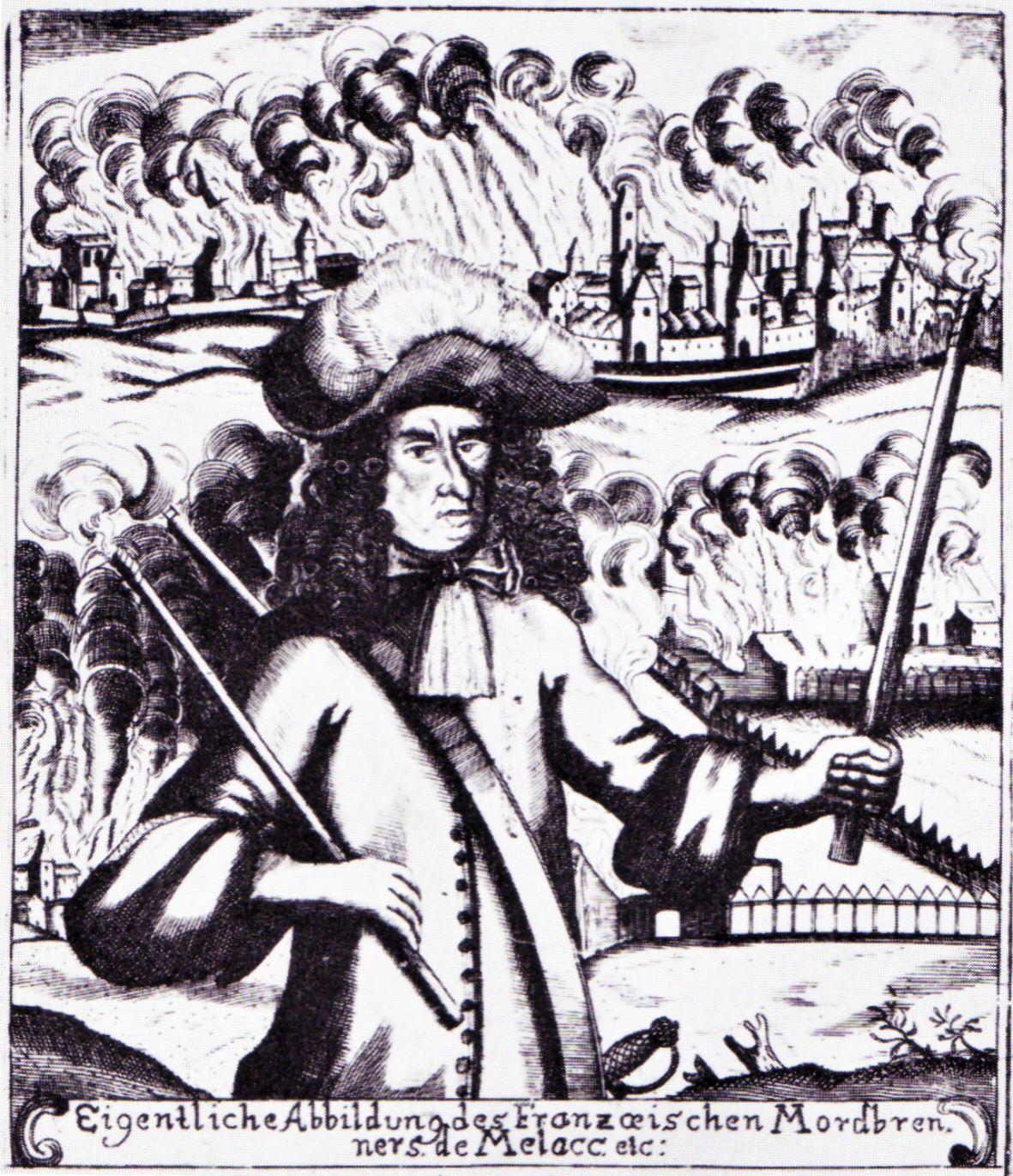
General Mélac, in a contemporary German pamphlet. The caption reads, "True Portrait of the Murdering French Arsonist de Melacc etc."

Ezéchiel du Mas, Comte de Mélac (about 1630, Sainte-Radegonde, Gironde – 10 May 1704) was a career soldier in the French army under King Louis XIV and war minister François-Michel le Tellier, Marquis de Louvois during the Nine Years' War.

He became notorious for mercilessly and brutally executing the French policy of devastating the enemy's lands rather than seeking major military engagements. The southwestern part of Germany—the Palatinate, the Margraviate of Baden, and the Duchy of Württemberg—especially suffered from Mélac's execution of Louvois's order, "brûlez le Palatinat!" (French: "Burn the Palatinate down!"). Under his command, numerous German towns and villages were set on fire and the livelihood of the population was destroyed. In present southwestern Germany, Mélac's name became a synonym for "murderer and arsonist". As a lasting result, until today, "Mélac" has also been turned into a common dog's name in this part of Germany. "Lack[e]l " (i.e., "oaf", if translated in a more friendly manner) is a pejorative common to the day in almost all of southern Germany and said to be derived from "Mélac" as its diminutive.

The General is considered by Germans the godfather of the French–German enmity that ultimately contributed to causing the two World Wars.

In contrast to the general German viewpoint, Saint-Simon in his famous Mémoires describes Mélac as an excellent soldier and a very pleasant person to his friends and to his superior officers, albeit he admits that the general was sometimes of too fiery a temperament, to the occasional detriment of his military success, and easily nettled by those whom he considered disrespectful towards him, and even that he had a "mania for making himself terrifying to the enemy."

== Melac's curriculum vitae ==
1630: Born around that year in Sainte-Radegonde, about 15 kilometers southeast of Libourne in today's Département of Gironde. He must have joined the military at an early age. Sources are scarce, as his file in the French military archives of Vincennes, as well as the Mélac family archive, are "strangely lost".

1664: Promoted to the rank of Lieutenant with a cavalry regiment in Portugal.

1666: Entrusted with the leadership of a company.

1672: Served in Flanders at the start of the Franco-Dutch War.

1675: Promoted to the rank of Maître de Camp de Cavalerie.

1677: Burned and sacked the (now Dutch) town of Sittard (40 km west of Aachen), one and a half weeks after other French troops had done the same. Only 68 buildings and two monasteries survived.

1679: Promotion to the rank of Brigadier; he became Governor of Schleiden (40 km southeast of Aachen).

1686: Began service in the army of Maréchal Catinat in Savoy.

1688: In April, Mélac joined the Rhine army under the command of Maréchal Duras.

1688: Married Maréchal de Duras's daughter.

1688: In September, the Rhine army moved into the territory of the Palatinate without formal declaration of war, which began the Nine Years' War, pitting France against a wide coalition of European states, including Britain (where the Protestant William, Prince of Orange, had overthrown his father-in-law and uncle, the Catholic James II, to become King William III), Spain, and the Holy Roman Empire. The French also moved into the territory east of the Rhine and conquered the cities of Heilbronn, Heidelberg and Mannheim (10 November) and the stronghold Philippsburg; Pforzheim had been occupied since 10 October. Mélac was stationed at the Imperial Town of Heilbronn under the command of Joseph de Montclar. Using Heilbronn as his base, Mélac devastated Southern Germany, including the Imperial Town of Donauwörth, Marbach and Schorndorf. At the year's end he attacked Heidelberg, the capital of the Palatinate, and many villages along the Neckar, including Ladenburg.

1689: On 16 February, executing a command of war minister Louvois, the French army under the command of de Mélac and the Comte de Tessé blew up Heidelberg Castle; on 2 March they attempted to burn down the city, though the citizens managed to extinguish the flames. On 8 March Mannheim was burnt. Later on, Frankenthal, Worms, Speyer and numerous villages west of the Rhine were devastated. East of the Rhine, Bretten, Maulbronn, Pforzheim, Baden-Baden, and numerous other towns and villages met the same fate, but it is not known in detail how heavily Mélac was directly involved in all these cases. In Pforzheim's case, Mélac was reportedly the commanding officer and thus directly responsible for the shelling of the town on 10 August and the devastating fire a few days later. There are also reports that he raped the young daughter of a pastor in Esslingen.

1690: Promoted to Maréchal de camp.

1691: Mélac's wife died.

1692: On 20 September, ordered the former Benedictine St. Peter and St. Paul Monastery put to the torch to Hirsau (formerly Hirschau); the monastery had, during its heyday, been one of the largest and most powerful forces for Catholicism in Germany until the Protestant Reformation, and had been the origin point for the "Hirsau Movement" in monastery reform, but had been used by Protestants since 1556.

1693: Promoted to Lieutenant General. In spring, Mélac became the commander of the strategically important stronghold of Landau. From this base, he again brought terror to the surrounding areas, as far as the Rhine-Hesse and Württemberg areas. In May, he participated in the second and final destruction of Heidelberg. While in Landau, his brutality did not subside. On one occasion, he reportedly exposed six naked prostitutes on the market square of Landau for two days, for which he received a reprimand from the royal court. Grim stories were told of French soldiers being shot if they protested Mélac's atrocities; one popular tale recounted that the general took to riding out each morning with a pack of hounds, setting them on anyone whom he would encounter.

1697: The Nine Years War was concluded with the Treaty of Ryswick. Mélac stayed on as stronghold commander of Landau.

1702: As part of the next major conflict France was involved in, the War of the Spanish Succession, the stronghold underwent the Siege of Landau by an army under the command of Louis William, Margrave of Baden. For four months, Mélac and his soldiers were able to resist. In order to keep his soldiers' morale up, he had gold and silver items from his personal possessions melted down and struck into coins as salary for his men. However, in September he was forced to surrender. He was allowed to withdraw with his garrison and part of his artillery. He left the Rhine army and travelled to the royal court in Fontainebleau, where he received 30,000 Livres as a pension, but did not receive a final promotion to a higher military rank.

1703: Living a secluded life in a house in the Rue des Tournelles in today's 4th Arrondissement in Paris with a few servants, at the end of August he wrote his last will.

1704: Mélac died on 10 May.

(Remark: Mélac's former residence in Landau has been turned into an inn, operating until this day. Initially named "Zum Mélac", the name was changed in 1851 to a neutral "Zur Krone" (At the Crown).)
