= Maximilian of Liechtenstein =

Liechtenstein nobleman

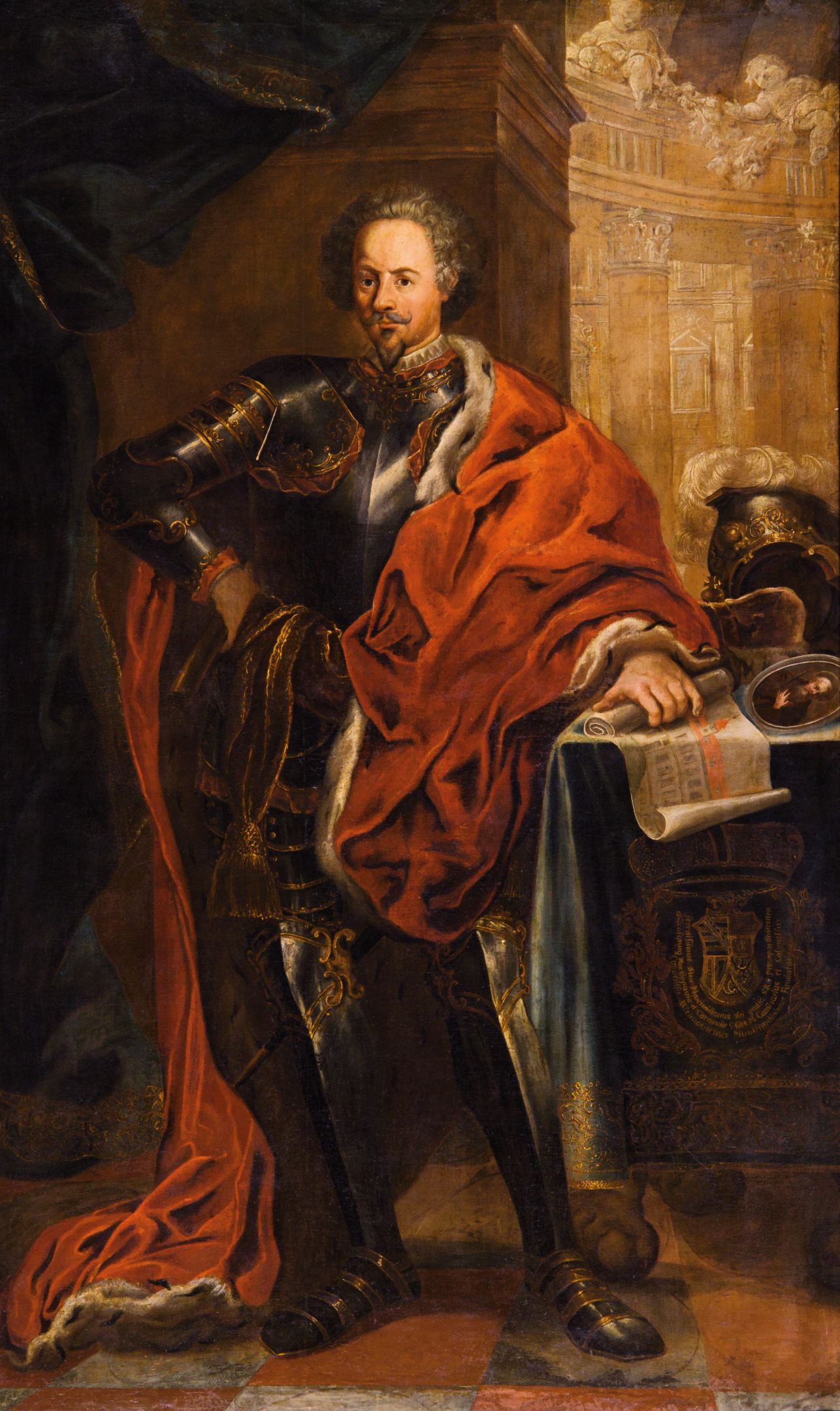
- Born: 6 November 1578
- Died: 29 April 1645 (aged 66); Győr
- Noble family: Liechtenstein
- Spouses: Catherine Šemberová of Boskovice and Černá Hora
- Father: Baron Hartmann II of Liechtenstein
- Mother: Countess Anna Maria of Ortenburg

Maximilian of Liechtenstein (6 November 1578 – 29 April 1645 in Győr) was a nobleman from the House of Liechtenstein. He was a senior military officer in the imperial Habsburg service, eventually promoted to the rank of Feldzeugmeister. In 1623, he was raised to Imperial Prince.

== Family ==
His parents were the imperial councilor, Baron Hartmann II of Liechtenstein and Anna Maria (1547–1601), daughter of Count Charles of Ortenburg. His brothers were Charles and Gundakar. At the age of 19, he married Baroness Catherine Šemberová of Boskovice and Černá Hora. Catherine was the only sister of Anna Maria, the wife of his brother Charles. When his father died in 1585, he inherited two properties in Lower Austria. When his father-in-law, Baron John Šembera of Boskovice and Černá Hora, died in 1597, the Boskovice dynasty died out in the male line and Maximilian inherited several Lordships in Moravia. In 1606, he signed a family treaty with his brothers, which provided that the first born of the eldest line of the family would always be the head of the House of Liechtenstein.

== Ascent ==
Like his brothers Maximilien converted from Protestantism to Catholicism. He served in the Imperial Army and in 1600, he participated in an unsuccessful attempt to relieve the city of Nagykanizsa, which was besieged by the Ottomans. In 1601 Emperor Rudolf II appointed him to the Aulic Council. In 1605, he served under Giorgio Basta near Esztergom, which was held successfully against the Ottomans. In 1605, he again fought in the Imperial army, before entering the service of the Moravian Estates. His new job was to recruit troops to protect Moravia against the Ottomans.

In 1608, a power struggle broke out between Emperor Rudolf II and his younger brother, Archduke Matthias. Maximilian and his brother Charles supported Matthias, who appointed Maximilian to Colonel-Quartermaster and Commander of the Artillery. Matthias won the conflict and forced Rudolf in 1611 to renounce almost all of his powers. In 1612, Maximilian participated in a war against Venice. Also in 1612, Emperor Rudolf II died and Matthias succeeded him. In 1613, Maximilian was appointed imperial Geheimrat and Master of the Horse. In the same year, he accompanied the Matthias to the Imperial Diet in Regensburg. In the courtly festivities he participated in a tournament modeled after the medieval knightly tournaments.

== Bohemian Revolt ==
At the outbreak of the Bohemian Revolt 1618 Maximilian sided with King Ferdinand. In 1619 he was commissioned with the installation of 500 cuirassierss and served in the army of the commander Bucquoy. When the imperial army had to retreat towards Vienna in the face of the overwhelming allied Hungarian and Bohemian units, Maximilian distinguished himself by protecting the army while it crossed the Danube. After the Bohemians had returned to Bohemia, Maximilian was put in command of the city Krems. He defended the city against enemy forces in November. In 1620 he was also re-appointed Colonel-Feldzeugmeister, and took part in the fighting in Bohemia.

In the Battle of the White Mountain in 1620, he played a big part in the victory of the imperial troops and the Catholic League over the army of the Bohemian Estates. He commanded the second engagement. After the battle, he moved into Prague and took over the crown jewels. In Moravia, he was involved in the pursuit of the rebels. In 1621, he participated in a campaign against the Hungarian rebels and took over command during the critical period after the death of the commander Bucquoy. His opponents had gained strength and made themselves felt while the Imperial troops suffered from supply problems. Because the soldiers were not paid, they began to desert. Maximilian was forced to retreat to Pozsony (today: Bratislava). In 1622 he fought in the Silesia and captured the fortress of Kłodzko, which had been in the hands of insurgents since 1618.

The Emperor rewarded him for his services with confiscated possessions of Charles of Kaunitz, plus a gift of 100000guilders, settling the imperial debt to Maximilian for providing troops. He used the money to purchase more confiscated property. In 1623, he again fought Hungarian rebels and was then appointed commander of all the imperial troops in Bohemia. He was also raised to Imperial Prince. After that, he rarely participated in direct military action. In 1624, he commanded the troops overseeing the expulsion of non-Catholic clergy from Moravia.

== Later life ==
In 1628, he took up command of the imperial army again, but only for a short time. In the same year, he was formally admitted to the Bohemian nobility. In 1638, he was promoted to commander of the Hungarian fortress of Győr and the surrounding area. There were no major battles against the Ottomans and he had time to reinforce the fortress.

His preferred residence was Rabensburg Castle in Lower Austria. He expanded the castle into a château. He adorned the main hall with paintings of the battles he had fought, and added modern fortification.

After his brother Charles died in 1627, Maximilian acted as guardian of his nephew Charles Eusebius until 1632. During this time, he was responsible for implementing the Counter-Reformation in the Liechtenstein dominions. During the ongoing Thirty Years' War, the Protestant side took control of the Duchy of Opava. After Wallenstein had reconquered Opava for the Catholic side, Maximilian was tasked with enforcing Catholicism in the duchy.

Maximilian and his wife gave numerous donations to various monasteries. In 1633, they founded a Minim monastery in Vranov. In this monastery, they created a crypt for the burial of members of the House of Liechtenstein.

Maximilian died in 1645. Since he had no heir, his possessions were divided between his brother Gundaker and his nephew Charles Eusebius.

== Ancestry ==
Ancestors of Maximilian of Liechtenstein

16. Baron Georg V of Liechtenstein
8. Baron Hartmann of Liechtenstein, Lord of Valtice
17. Baroness Agnes of Eckartsau
4. Baron Georg Hartmann of Liechtenstein, Lord of Valtice
18. Bernard, Lord of Mainburg
9. Johanna, Lady of Mainburg
19. Cunigunde, Lady of Pottendorff
2. Baron Hartmann II of Liechtenstein, Lord of Valtice, Lednice and Steyregg
20. Baron Heinrich VII of Liechtenstein
10. Baron Georg VI of Liechtenstein, Lord of Steyregg
21. Countess Agnes of Starhemberg
5. Baroness Susanna of Liechtenstein
22. Wolfgang IV, Baron of Polheim
11. Baroness Magdalena of Polheim
23. Baroness Johanna of Borsselen
1. Maximilian, Prince of Liechtenstein
24. Sebastian I, Count of Ortenburg
12. Ulrich II, Count of Ortenburg
25. Baroness Maria of Rohrbach-Neuburg
6. Karl I, Count of Ortenburg
26. Baron Hans of Aichberg-Laberweinting-Söldenau-Reichsdorf
13. Baroness Veronika of Aichberg
27. Baroness Siguna of Kraigk
3. Countess Anna Maria of Ortenburg
28. Count Siegmund of Fraunberg-Haag
14. Leonhard II of Fraunberg, Count of Haag
29. Baroness Margareta of Aichberg
7. Countess Maximiliana of Fraunberg-Haag
30. Friedrich V, Landgrave of Leuchtenberg
15. Landgravine Amalie of Leuchtenberg
31. Countess Dorothea of Rieneck
