= Anna Maria Šemberová of Boskovice and Černá Hora =

Princess of Liechtenstein from 1608 to 1625

Anna Maria
- Duchess of Troppau and Jägerndorf
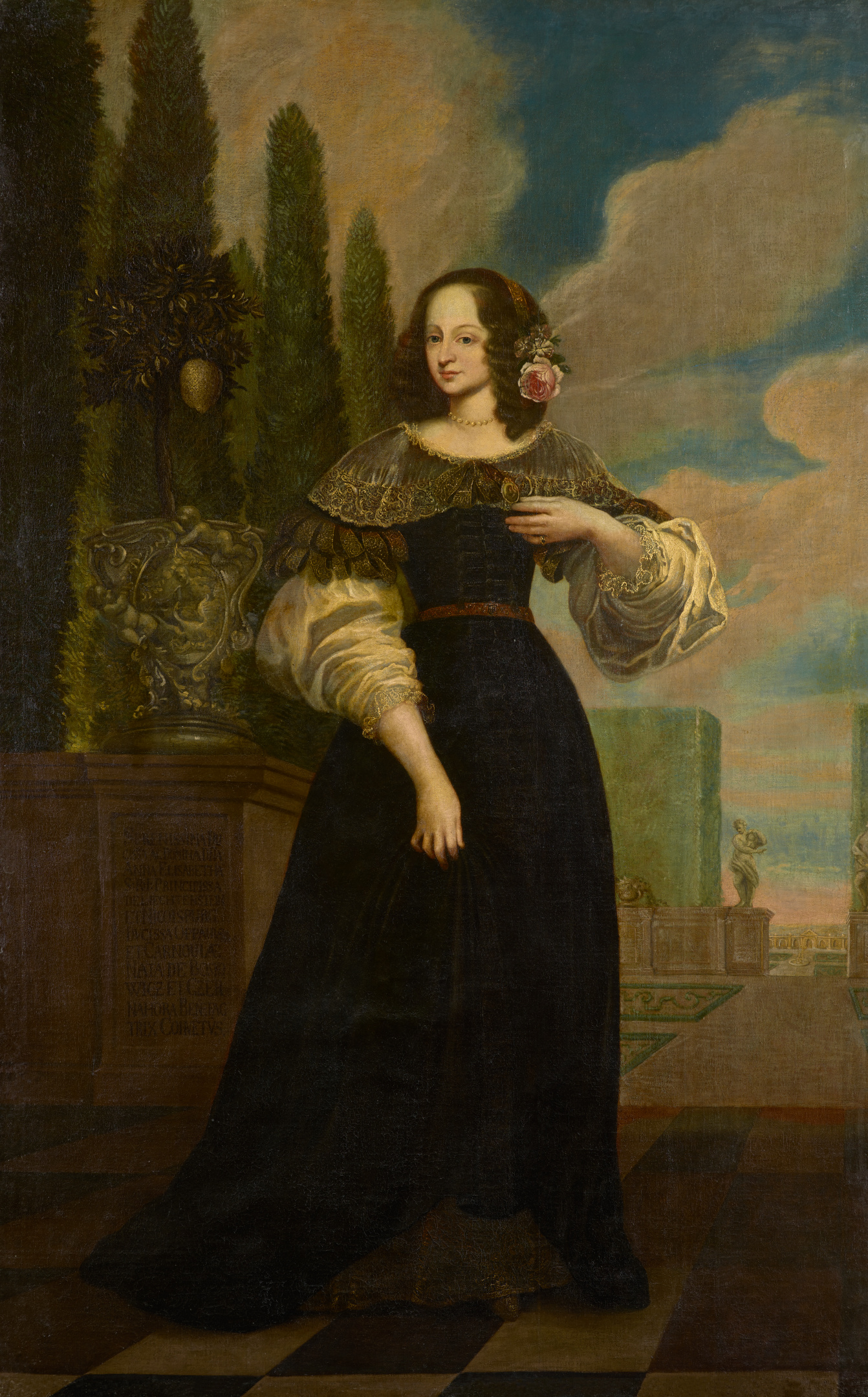

Princess consort of Liechtenstein
- Tenure: 20 December 1608 – 6 June 1625
- Born: 1575; Vienna, Archduchy of Austria, Holy Roman Empire
- Died: 6 June 1625 (aged 49–50); Plumlov, Kingdom of Bohemia, Holy Roman Empire
- Burial: Church of the Nativity of the Virgin Mary, Vranov, Czech Republic
- Spouse: Karl I, Prince of Liechtenstein (m. 1590)
- Issue: Karl Eusebius, Prince of Liechtenstein
- House: Boskovic
- Father: Baron Jan Šembera z Boskovic a Černohorský
- Mother: Baroness Anna Krajířové z Krajku

Anna Maria Šemberová of Boskovice and Černá Hora and Aussee (also written as Anna Maria von Černá Hora und Boskowitz, Anna Marie Černohorská z Boskovic, and Anna Marie z Boskovic a Černé Hory; 1575 – 6 June 1625) was a Moravian noblewoman who, through her marriage to Karl I, was the first Princess of Liechtenstein and Duchess of Troppau and Jägerndorf.

== Biography ==
Boskovic family coat of arms

Baroness Anna Maria Šemberová of Boskovice and Černá Hora and Aussee was born in 1575 in Vienna to Baron Jan Šembera z Boskovic a Černohorský and Baroness Anna Krajířové z Krajku, who were both members of the Moravian nobility.

In 1590 she married Baron Karl von Liechtenstein, a Moravian nobleman and the son of Hartmann II, Baron of Liechtenstein and Countess Anna Maria of Ortenburg. In 1608 her husband was created the first Prince of Liechtenstein by Matthias, Holy Roman Emperor, thus making her the first Princess of Liechtenstein. In 1613 her husband acquired the Duchy of Troppau and in 1622 he acquired the Duchy of Jägerndorf, thus making her the Duchess of Troppau and the Duchess of Jägerndorf.

Anna Maria and Karl I had five children:

- Prince Heinrich (died young, after 1612).
- Princess Anna Maria (1597–1638) ∞ married Maximilian, Prince of Dietrichstein (1596–1655).
- Princess Franziska Barbara (1604–1655) ∞ married Werner Wenzel de T'Serclaes Tilly (1599–1653).
- Karl Eusebius, Prince of Liechtenstein (1611–1684), ∞ married Johanna Beatrix of Dietrichstein (1626–1676).
- Princess Anna Maria (died on 6 June 1625)

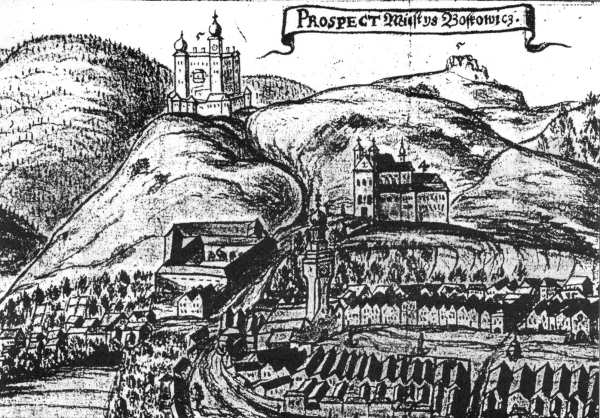
Boskovic Castle in the second quarter of the 18th century, which was inherited by Anna Maria and her sister, Catherine, upon their father's death (19th century)

Her sister Catherine married her husband's brother, Baron Maximilian of Liechtenstein. Both she and her sister inherited their father's lands, including Boskovic Castle, upon his death in 1597 due to the fact that he had no male heirs.

== Death ==
Princess Anna Maria died on 6 June 1625 in Plumlov, Kingdom of Bohemia, aged 50.

She was buried, alongside her husband, in the Liechtenstein family crypt at the Church of the Nativity of the Virgin Mary in Vranov.
