= Hans-Adam, Prince of Liechtenstein =

Hans-Adam, Prince of Liechtenstein, may refer to:

- Hans-Adam I, Prince of Liechtenstein (1662-1712), Prince of Liechtenstein
- Hans-Adam II, Prince of Liechtenstein (born 1945), Prince of Liechtenstein
