= Johanna Beatrix of Dietrichstein =

Princess of Liechtenstein from 1644 to 1676

- Duchess of Troppau and Jägerndorf

Princess consort of Liechtenstein
- Tenure: 6 August 1644 – 26 March 1676
- Born: 1625; Vienna
- Died: 26 March 1676 (aged 50–51); Brno
- Spouse: Karl Eusebius, Prince of Liechtenstein (m. 1644)
- Issue: 9; including Hans-Adam I, Prince of Liechtenstein and Eleonora Maria Rosalia of Troppau and Jägerndorf
- House: Dietrichstein
- Father: Maximilian, Prince of Dietrichstein
- Mother: Princess Anna Maria of Liechtenstein

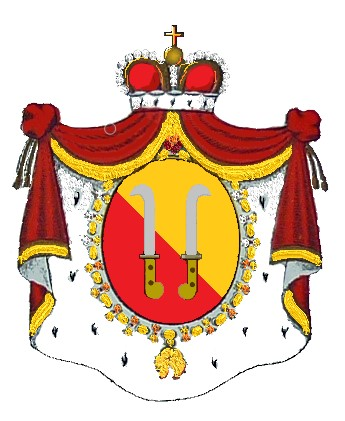
Coat of arms of the House of Dietrichstein

Princess Johanna Beatrix von Dietrichstein (1625 – 26 March 1676), was a German noblewoman, by birth a member of the princely House of Dietrichstein and by marriage Princess of Liechtenstein.

== Early life ==
She was the fifth child and fourth (but third surviving) daughter of Maximilian, 2nd Prince von Dietrichstein zu Nikolsburg, and his first wife Princess Anna Maria of Liechtenstein, a daughter of Karl I, Prince of Liechtenstein, Duke of Troppau and Jägerndorf and Anna Maria Šemberová of Boskovice and Černá Hora.

== Marriage and issue ==
On 6 August 1644 Johanna Beatrix married Karl Eusebius, Prince of Liechtenstein (11 April 1611 – 5 April 1684). They had eleven children:

- Ernest Rochus (2 February 1646 – ca. 30 March 1647).
- Eleonora Maria Rosalia (ca. 15 May 1647 – 7 August 1703), married on 4 July 1666 to Johann Seyfried, Prince of Eggenberg, Duke of Český Krumlov and Princely Count (gefürsteter Graf) of Gradisca d'Isonzo. Had one son - Giovanni Antonio di Eggenberg (1669-1716)
- Anna Maria (ca. 24 May 1648 – 14 March 1654).
- Johanna Beatrix (28 Jun 1649 – 12 January 1672), married on 29 April 1669 to Maximilian II Jakob Moritz, Prince of Liechtenstein. Had issue. Aloisia Josepha von Liechtenstein (1670-1737), Maximiliane von Liechtenstein (1671-1717)
- Maria Theresia (1650 – 25 January 1716), married firstly on 16 July 1667 to Count Jakob Leslie (1636-1691) - had one son Jakob Ernst Leslie (1669-1737), and secondly on 3 February 1693 to Count Johann Balthasar von Wagensperg, Baron von Sonnegg.
- Franz Dominik Eusebius (1 November 1652 – 6 November 1652).
- Karl Joseph (1 November 1652 – 7 November 1652), twin with Franz Dominik Eusebius.
- Franz Eusebius Wenzel (31 May 1654 – 25 June 1655).
- Cäcilie (6 August 1655 – 9 November 1655).
- Johann (Hans) Adam Andreas (16 August 1662 – 16 June 1712), Prince of Liechtenstein.
- A daughter (died in infancy, April 1661).

Johanna Beatrix died in Brno aged 51.
