= Carl II =

Carl II may refer to:

- Charles VIII of Sweden (1409–1470) or Carl II, King of Sweden (and of Norway as Carl I)
- Karl Eusebius, Prince of Liechtenstein (1611–1684)
- Charles XIII of Sweden or Carl XIII (1748–1818), also Carl II of Norway
- Carl Ludwig II, Prince of Hohenlohe-Langenburg (1829–1907)
