= Eleonora Maria Rosalia of Troppau and Jägerndorf =

German-Austrian noblewoman and remedy book writer (1647–1704)

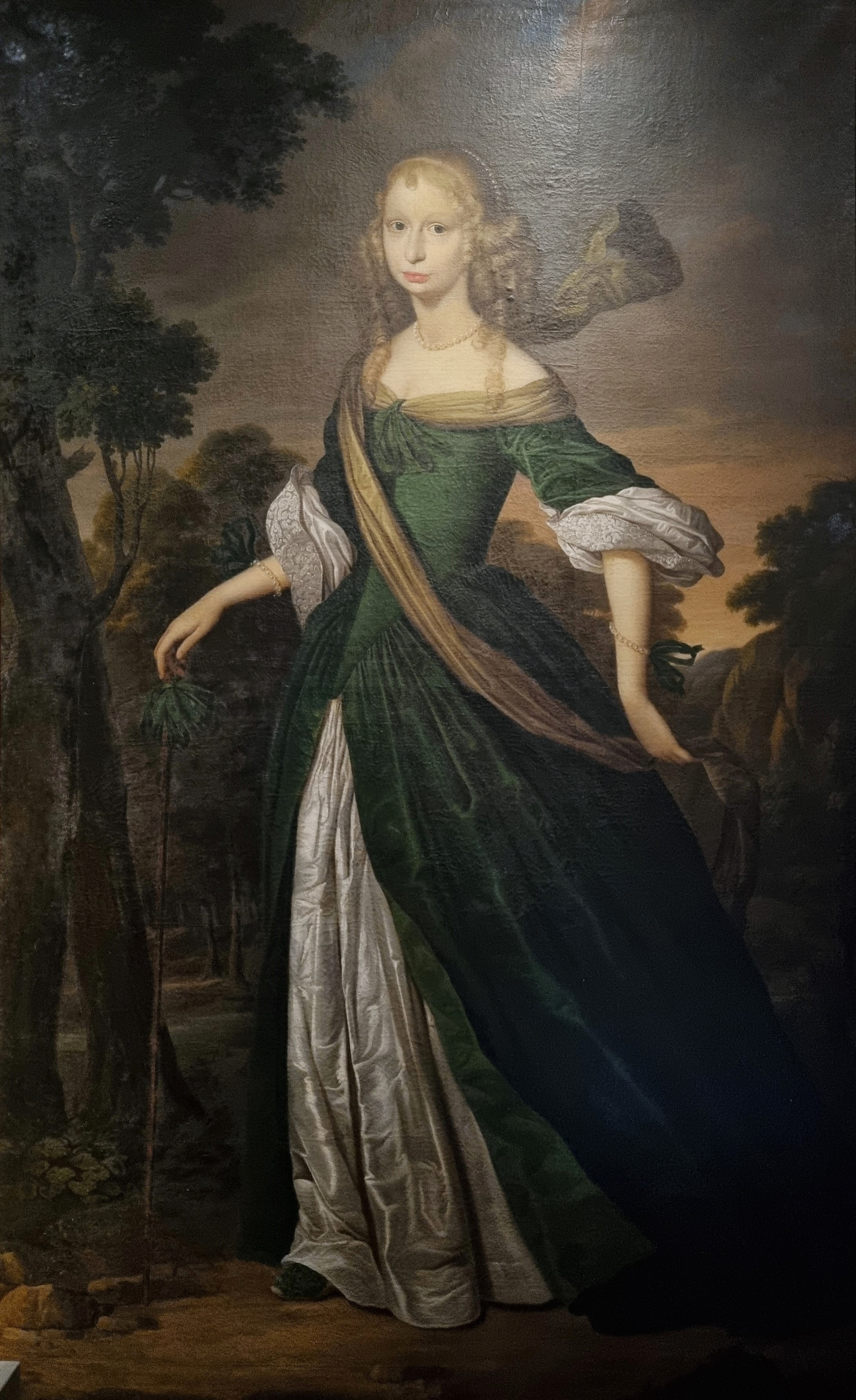
- Portrait of Eleonora in about 1670
- Born: 1647
- Died: 1704 (aged 56–57)
- Spouse: Johann Seifried von Eggenberg
- Father: Karl Eusebius, Prince of Liechtenstein
- Mother: Johanna Beatrix of Dietrichstein

Eleonora Maria Rosalia, Duchess of Troppau and Jägerndorf (also called Eleonora of Liechstenstein and Eleonora of Eggenberg, 1647–1704) was a German-Austrian noblewoman who published a popular book of recipes and remedies.

Eleonora was the eldest daughter of Karl Eusebius, Prince of Liechtenstein and his niece, Johanna Beatrix of Dietrichstein. In 1666, she married Prince Johann Seyfried of Eggenberg. They had children including their heir, Johann.

In 1695, under the title of Herzogin (Duchess) of Troppau and Jägerndorf, Eleonora published Freywillig-auffgesprungener Granat-Apffel des Christlichen Samaritans (The Christian Samaritan's Freely Opened Pomegranate), which contained over 1800 recipes for cookery and home remedies. It became one of the most popular German remedy books of the eighteenth century, going through twenty editions by 1752.

The book includes food recipes, including one of the earliest published recipes for fried chicken, and advice for preventative and curative health measures through diet. While her recipes usually did not contain magical elements, she included one remedy for epilepsy which involved burning several ingredients including human body parts under a waning moon. The book was intended as a charitable work aimed at rural and non-noble readers, including ingredients which were easy to obtain and largely focusing on the illnesses of women and children.
