= Erdmuthe Maria Theresia of Dietrichstein =

Austrian noblewoman and Princess of Liechtenstein

- Duchess of Troppau and Jägerndorf
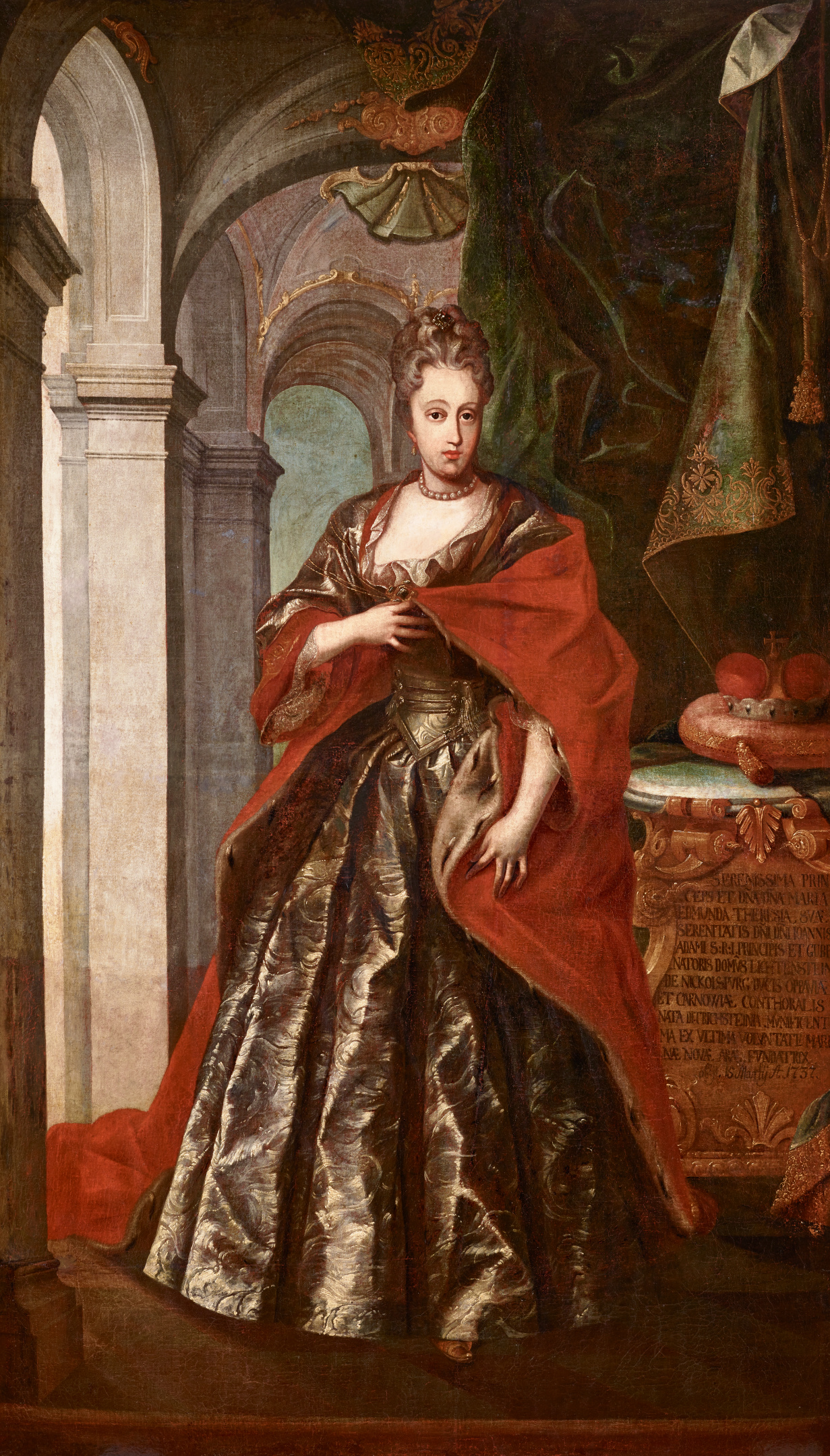

Princess consort of Liechtenstein
- Tenure: 5 April 1684 – 16 June 1712
- Born: 17 April 1662; Nikolsburg
- Died: 16 March 1737 (aged 74)
- Spouse: Hans-Adam I (m. 1681; died 1712)
- Issue: Maria Theresia of Liechtenstein
- House: Dietrichstein
- Father: Ferdinand Joseph, Prince of Dietrichstein
- Mother: Princess Marie Elisabeth of Eggenberg

Erdmuthe Maria Theresia of Dietrichstein (17 April 1662 – 16 March 1737), was an Austrian noblewoman, Princess of Liechtenstein by marriage to Hans-Adam I, Prince of Liechtenstein.

== Life ==
Born in Nikolsburg, she was the fifth child and second (but eldest surviving) daughter of Ferdinand Joseph, 3rd Prince of Dietrichstein, member of the princely House of Dietrichstein, and his wife, Princess Marie Elisabeth of Eggenberg (1640-1715), Duke of Krumau and Princely Count (gefürsteter Graf) of Gradis am Sontig.

== Biography ==
In Vienna on 16 February 1681, Erdmuthe married her first cousin, Hans-Adam, Hereditary Prince of Liechtenstein (16 August 1662 – 16 June 1712). They had eleven children:

After the death of her father-in-law in 1684, Erdmuthe became Princess consort of Liechtenstein. She died in Vienna aged 74 and was buried in the Liechtenstein family crypt in Vranov.

== Issue ==
- A son (born and died 14 January 1682).
- Maria Elisabeth (9 May 1683 – 8 May 1744), married firstly on 21 April 1703 to Maximilian II Jakob Moritz, Prince of Liechtenstein (no issue), and secondly on 28 February 1713 to Leopold, Duke of Schleswig-Holstein-Sonderburg-Wiesenburg had issue - Theresia Maria Ana (1713-1745), Eleanor Maria Guastalla (1715-1760), Gabrielle Felicitas (1716-1798), Maria Charlotte Antonia (1718-1765), Hedwig (1721-1735)
- Karl Joseph Wenzel (15 October 1684 – 16 January 1704), Hereditary Prince of Liechtenstein.
- Maria Antonia Appolonia Rosina (23 March 1687 – 9 October 1750), married firstly on 24 January 1704 to Markus Anton Adam, Count Czobor de Czoborszentmihály (d. 1728) and had one son - Joseph Czobor (1705-1785), and secondly on 29 April 1731 to Karl, Count Hrzán of Harras (d. 1749).
- Maria Anna (8 May 1688 – died young).
- Franz Dominik Aegidius Florian (2 September 1689 – 9 March 1711), Hereditary Prince of Liechtenstein.
- Maria Gabriele Anna Alexia (17 July 1692 – 8 November 1713), married on 1 December 1712 to Joseph Johann Adam, Prince of Liechtenstein.
- Maria Theresia Anna Felizitas (12 May 1694 – 20 February 1772), married on 24 October 1713 to Thomas Emmanuel, Prince of Savoy-Carignan.
- Maria Margaretha Anna (19 August 1697 – 9 January 1702).
- Maria Dominika Magdalena (17 August 1698 – 3 June 1724), married on 21 May 1719 to Heinrich Joseph Johann, Prince of Auersperg.
- Johann Baptist (26 August 1700 – 27 August 1700).
