= Marguerite de Lussan =

French historical novelist (1682–1758)

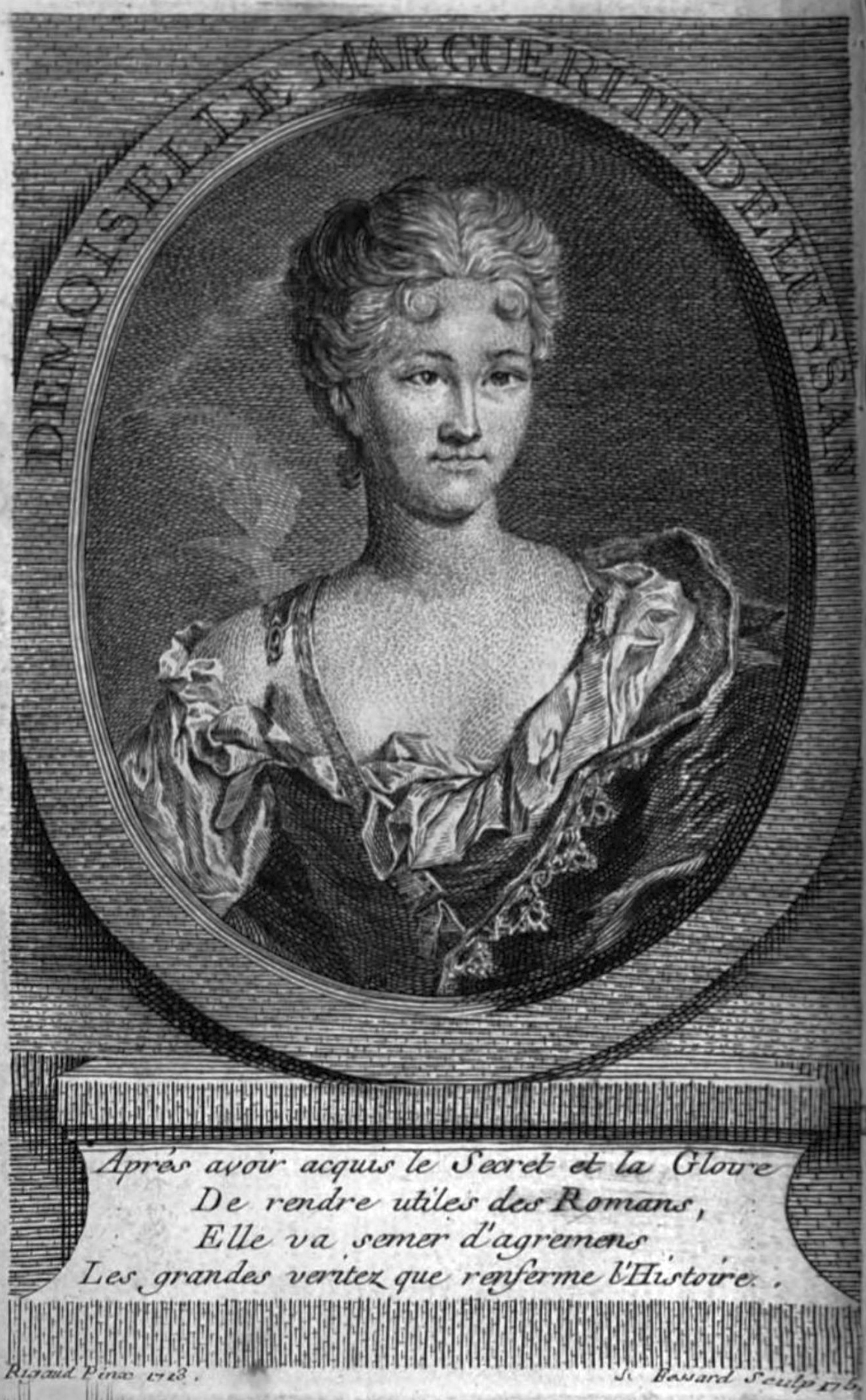
- Born: c. 1682 Paris, France
- Died: 31 May 1758 (aged 75) Paris, France
- Occupation: Historical novelist

Marguerite de Lussan (c. 1682 – 31 May 1758) was an eighteenth century French historical novelist.

== Biography ==
De Lussan was born in Paris in around 1682. It was rumoured that she was a natural daughter of Louis Thomas of Savoy-Carignano, Count of Soissons, born from his relationship with an unknown courtesan or a fortune teller named La Fleury, the latter theory appearing to be preferred by "modern research". At any rate, the prince "took a special interest in her education and permitted her to bear his arms", and she remained on friendly terms with her alleged uncle, Prince Eugene of Savoy.

De Lussan was a historic novelist, encouraged to write by the scholar Pierre Daniel Huet. She based her writing on research that she conducted in chronicles and manuscripts. She dedicated her first novel to the novelist and playwright Jean-Louis-Ignace de La Serre, sieur de Langlade, an "intimate friend" and possible lover.

De Lussan's work Anecdotes de la Cour de Philippe-Auguste is noted as contrasting the story of two heroines and the consequences of their responses to the diktats of their parents.

De Lussan died from acute gastritis on 31 May 1758 in Paris, when she was aged 75.

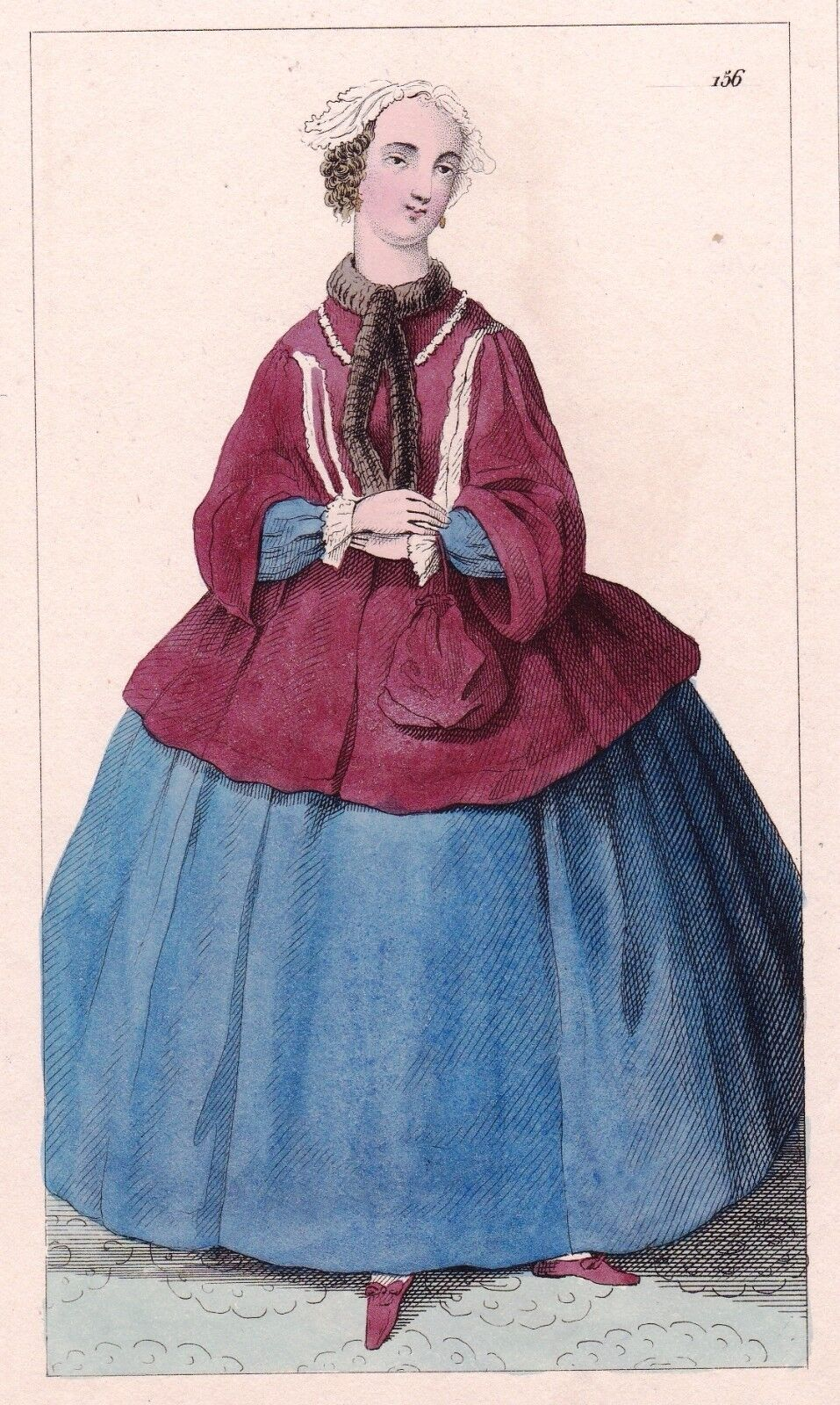
Marguerite de Lussan in Costumes historiques de la France (19th century)

== Publications ==
- Histoire de la Comptesse de Gondés (1727 and 1752, 2 volumes)
- Les Veillées de Thessalie (1731)
- Anecdotes de la Cour de Philippe-Auguste (1733-8, 6 volumes)
- Mémoires Secret, et Intrigues de la Cour de France sous Charles VII (1741)
- Anecdotes de la Cour de François I (1748, 8 volumes)
- Marie d’Angleterre, Reine d'Ecosse (1749)
- Annales Galantes de la Cour de Henri II (1749, 9 volumes)
- Mourat et Turquia, Histoire Africaine (1752)
- l’Histoire de la vie du règne de Charles VI, roi de France (1753)
- l’Histoire du règne de Louis XI (1755)
- De l’Histoire de la dernière révolution de Naples (1756)
