= Siege of Landau (1702) =

1702 conflict

Coordinates: 49°12′N 8°7′E

- Part of War of the Spanish Succession
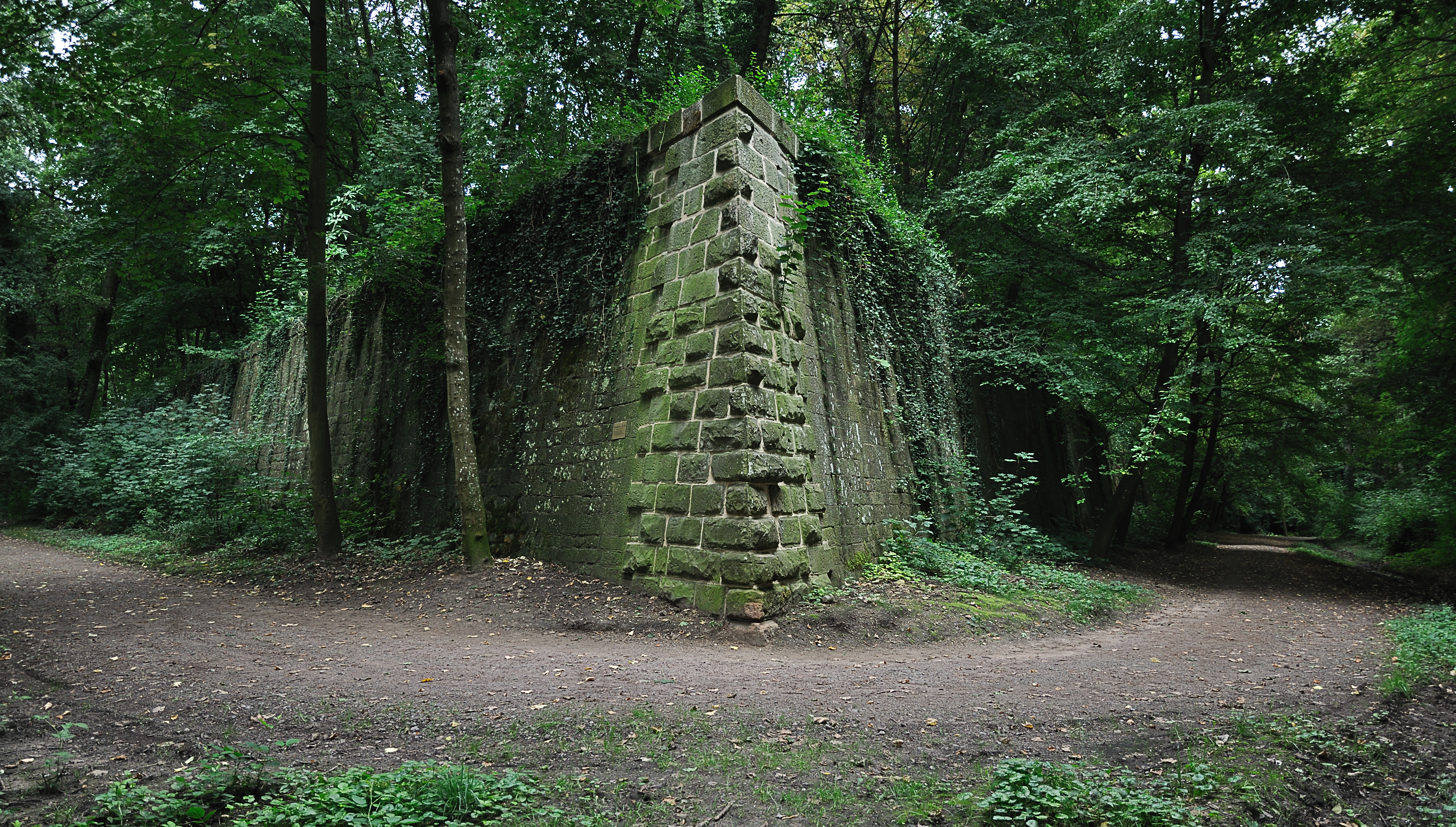
- Parts of Landau's defenses from the 1680s still exist.
Date	16 June – 12 September 1702
Location	Landau, Rhineland-Palatinate, Germany
Result	Imperial victory

Belligerents
(Habsburg monarchy) Holy Roman Empire	Kingdom of France

Commanders and leaders
(Habsburg monarchy) Louis of Baden (Habsburg monarchy) Archduke Joseph (Habsburg monarchy) Louis Thomas of Savoy †	(Kingdom of France) Comte de Mélac (Kingdom of France) Nicolas Catinat

Strength
46,000	4,335

Casualties and losses
2,865	At least 1,700

The siege of Landau took place from 16 June to 12 September 1702, during the War of the Spanish Succession. An Imperial army led by Louis William, Margrave of Baden-Baden captured Landau, a fortress town in the Rhineland-Palatinate held by a French garrison commanded by the Comte de Mélac.

The earliest actions from the war were focused in northern Italy in 1701, but military activity began in the Electoral Palatinate the following year. In the Palatinate, Louis of Baden and an Imperial army crossed the Rhine River at Speyer and moved south to invest Landau. Unwilling to challenge his stronger foes, Nicolas Catinat with his French army watched from a distance as the Landau defenses were methodically reduced by siege artillery, mining and infantry attacks. After losing a key defensive position, Mélac and his garrison were forced to capitulate. At this time, the Electorate of Bavaria became a French ally, tipping the balance of power and causing Louis of Baden to withdraw. The next clash was the Battle of Friedlingen on 14 October 1702.

== Background ==
Once an Imperial city, Landau was awarded to the Kingdom of France by the Treaty of Westphalia in 1648. Under the direction of the French military engineer Sébastien Le Prestre de Vauban, the city's fortifications were completely reconstructed starting in the spring of 1688 and continuing for three years. In 1689 a fire burned down three-quarters of the city, allowing the French to redesign the streets under the direction of another engineer officer Jacques Tarade. In 1700 Tarade added the Crownwork on a hill on the northwest side of the city as additional protection. The Queich River split Landau into northern and southern parts. The eight-sided fortress was protected by a bastion at each corner and surrounded by a moat. A clever system of locks allowed the defenders to control the depth of water in the ditches. A fast-flowing waterway called the Flaque made assault impossible on two-thirds of the fortress. A single bridge over the Flaque linked Landau with the Crownwork.

The first fighting in the War of the Spanish Succession began in Italy, where Prince Eugene of Savoy's Imperial army outmaneuvered Marshal Nicolas Catinat's larger French army in 1701. The baffled Catinat was soon transferred to defend Alsace. On 7 September 1701 the Grand Alliance was formed to halt the aggression of the Kingdom of France. The Grand Alliance included the Holy Roman Empire, Kingdom of England, Dutch Republic, Margraviate of Brandenburg, Electoral Palatinate and most German states. France's allies were the Duchy of Savoy, Electorate of Cologne and Duchy of Mantua.

In early 1702, Louis William, Margrave of Baden-Baden was given command of the troops of the Swabian, Franconian, Upper Rhenish and Westphalian Imperial Circles and the Electoral Palatinate. In April Louis crossed to the west bank of the Rhine near Speyer and turned to the south. The Imperial army occupied Wissembourg and Lauterbourg before marching on Landau. The Palatine army was camped at Lustadt while 2,000 men under Count Leiningen held Germersheim. Count Friesen was first stationed at Rastatt on the east bank; he crossed to the west bank on 22 April and joined the army of Louis. On 24 April, Louis reconnoitered the fortress and then began building an entrenched camp at Langenkandel for his own army. These activities preceded the declaration of war which occurred on 15 May. In fact the Holy Roman Empire was not officially at war until 6 October. Louis of Baden was named commander of all troops on the Rhine on 18 June.

== Forces ==
Louis of Baden's Imperial host numbered 25,900 infantry and 10,920 cavalry organized into 41 battalions and 71 squadrons. The largest segment of the army were the Imperial troops, consisting of 8,400 foot and 8,000 horse. The cavalry comprised six squadrons each of the Cuirassier Regiments Castell, Cusani, Darmstadt, Gronsfeld, Hohenzollern, Hannover and Zante and Dragoon Regiment Styrum. The infantry included four battalions of Marsigli, two battalions of Thüngen and one battalion each of Baden, Bayreuth, Fürstenberg, Osnabrück and Salm Infantry Regiments. The Palatinate contributed the second largest contingent, 4,800 infantry and 800 cavalry. These soldiers were organized as three squadrons each of the Vehlen Dragoon and Hofkirchen Cuirassier Regiments, one battalion of the Anspach and two battalions each of the Iselbach, Lübeck and Saxe-Meining Infantry Regiments.

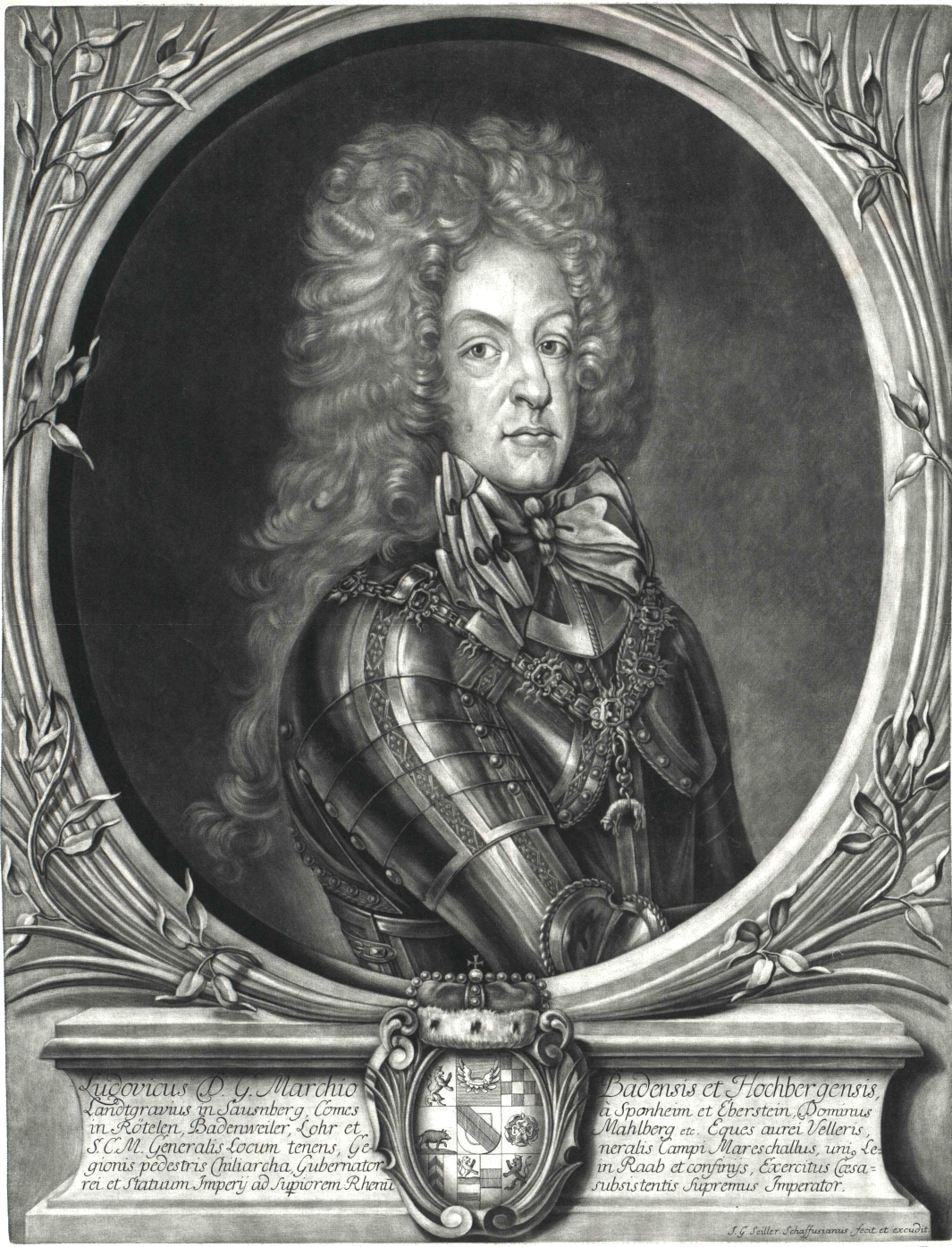
Margrave Louis of Baden

The Würzburg contingent counted 3,000 foot and 800 horse, including four squadrons of the Schad Dragoon Regiment, three battalions of the Bibra and two battalions of the Fuchs Infantry Regiments. The Swabian forces numbered 3,500 foot and 240 horse, consisting of two squadrons of the Württemberg Dragoon Regiment and one battalion each of the Baden-Baden, Baden-Durlach, Fürstenberg-Möskirch, Fürstenberg-Stühling and Reischach Infantry Regiments. The Upper Rhenish Circle contributed 2,400 infantry and 360 cavalry, made up of three squadrons of the Darmstadt Dragoon Regiment and two battalions each of the Buttlar and Nassau-Weilburg Infantry Regiments. The Electorate of Mainz force counted 2,400 foot and 360 horse, including three squadrons of the Bibra Dragoon Regiment and two battalions each of the Kurmainz and Schrattenbach Infantry Regiments. There were 1,400 Franconian infantry, organized as one battalion each of the Erffa and Schnebelin Infantry Regiments. The army also had one squadron each of Anspach, Oettinger and Württemberg Guard Cavalry.

Not all the available troops are listed. To protect the siege against French incursions, Louis posted 10 battalions and 15 squadrons on the Lauter River under Christian Ernst, Margrave of Brandenburg-Bayreuth, seven battalions and 12 squadrons at Rastatt and seven battalions and eight squadrons on the upper Rhine. By June, Louis' army numbered 32,000 foot and 14,000 horse. The Imperial army's general officers included Feldmarschall Hans Karl von Thüngen who fought with Louis at the Battle of Slankamen, Bernhard I, Duke of Saxe-Meiningen, Charles Alexander, Duke of Württemberg, John Ernst, Count of Nassau-Weilburg, Franz Sebastian von Thürheim and Maximilian Karl Albert, Prince of Löwenstein-Wertheim-Rochefort.

In the face of the large Imperial host, the weaker French army of Marshal Catinat fell back, but not before reinforcing Landau with two battalions of Royal Artillery. Landau was defended by the 72-year-old Lieutenant General Ezéchiel du Mas, Comte de Mélac who commanded a garrison of 4,095 infantry and 240 cavalrymen. Mélac was notorious for his brutal devastation of the Palatinate in 1688. Aside from the gunners, Mélac's force consisted of two battalions of the Nettancourt Infantry Regiment, one battalion each of the Sarre, Bourbon and Soissonaise Infantry Regiments, two squadrons of the Forsac Cavalry Regiment and the Mélac Free Company. The free company was composed of enemy deserters. Mélac's deputy was Brigadier de l'Esperoux, the infantry commander was Brigadier d'Amigny, the artillery officer was du Breuil, the engineer officer was Villars and the commander of the Crownwork was Lieutenant Colonel Colomes. After the fortress was surrounded, a number of officers who had been on leave tried to slip through the investment to join their units inside the fortress. On 18 May, Brigadier de Guesques and Colonel de Nettancourt were captured by Palatine cavalry just outside the gates. D'Amigny successfully sneaked in on 16 June disguised as a peasant. During the siege the Nettancourt Regiment was led by Colonel de Gournay.

== Siege ==
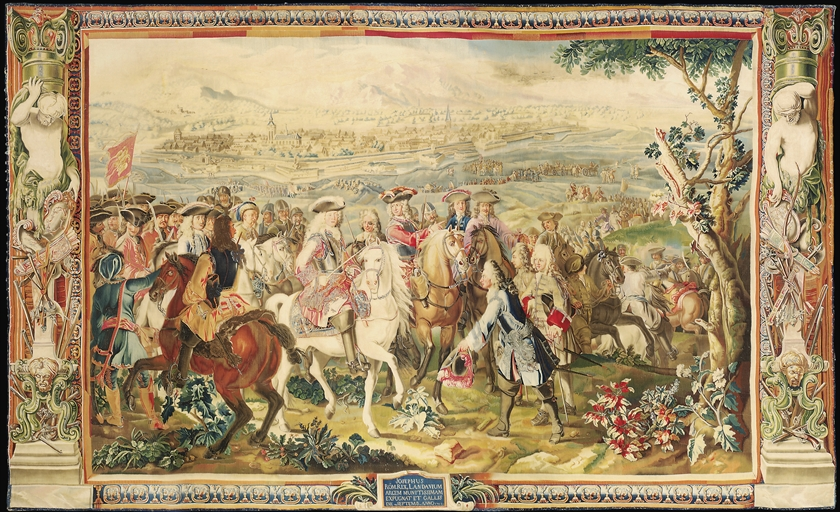
Tapestry depicts a scene from the 1702 siege of Landau.

On 15 June 1702, Louis of Baden left his camp at Langenkandel and advanced his entire army to the vicinity of Landau. He disposed his troops in six encampments around the fortress with his headquarters at Arzheim. In the siege which began on the 16th, three attacks were planned. Louis personally directed the main attack against the south gate. The counts of Nassau-Weilburg and Leiningen led the Palatine troops in a false attack against the earthworks on Queichausfluss while Thüngen commanded the attack against the Crownwork. Using their plentiful supply of ammunition, the French gunners delivered heavy and accurate fire on the Imperial trenching forces. In order to protect the working parties, the men were fitted with helmets and cuirasses borrowed from the heavy cavalrymen.

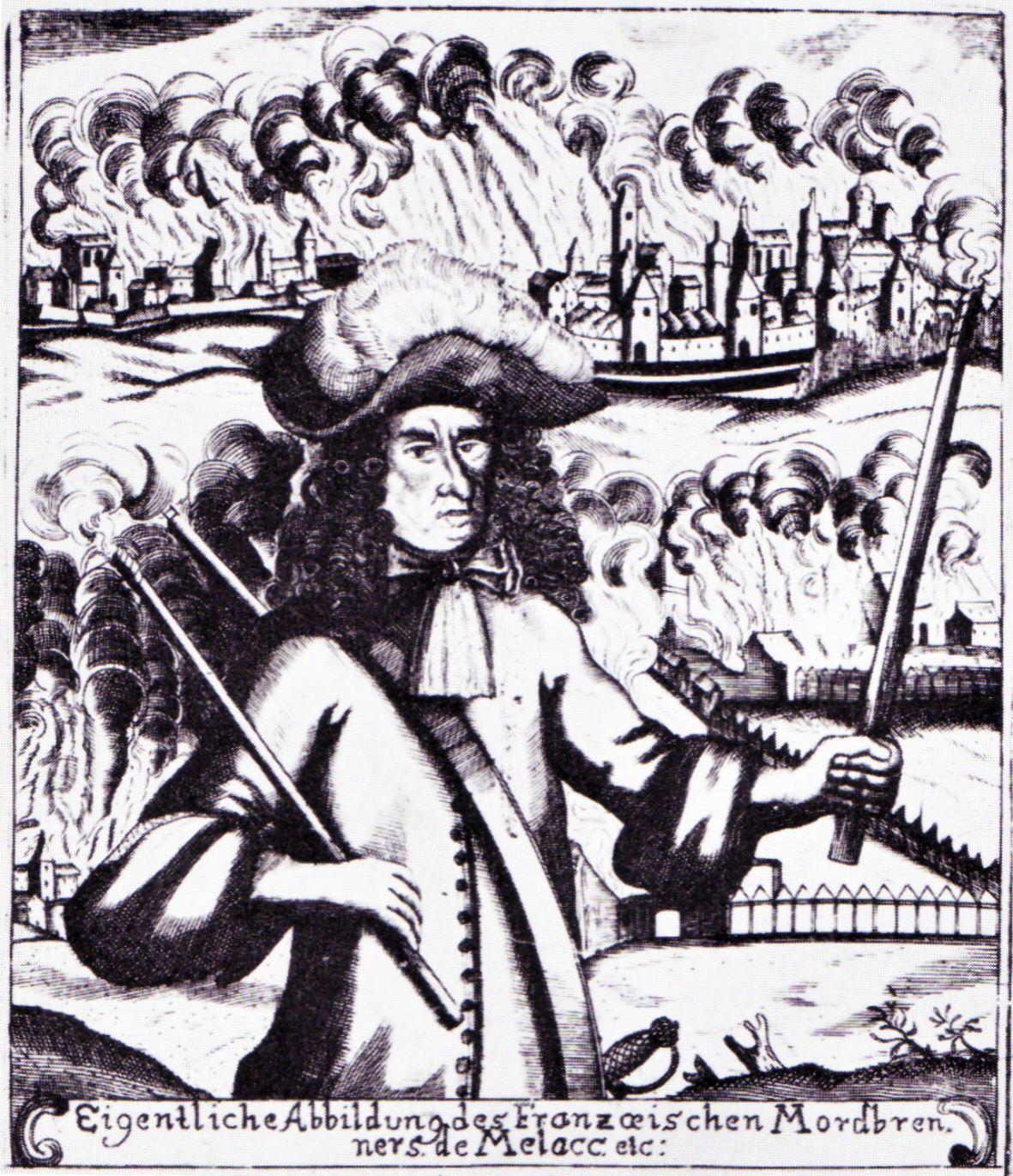
Comte de Mélac became notorious for burning cities and farms in the Palatinate in 1688.

At the beginning of the investment, Louis' army did not possess any siege artillery. Nevertheless, battery positions were excavated and initially armed with field pieces. These light cannons did little damage to the fortress walls. After negotiations by Prince Löwenstein, a siege train was formed from heavy guns contributed by the imperial cities of Augsburg, Frankfurt, Nuremberg and Ulm. Additional gunpowder was provided by the cities of Hanau and Darmstadt. The first convoy of 42 Halb-Karthaunen cannons, two Viertel-Karthaunen cannons and 13 mortars arrived on 21 June. Louis hired 20 expert gunners from the Palatinate and 22 more from Bohemia. With their assistance, the bombardment of Landau commenced on 2 July. Another batch of 60 Bohemian gunners arrived on 7 July and some were used to man a new 8-gun battery that came into action on the 9th. Ultimately, Louis' army employed 46 mortars and 114 cannons, including weapons of 30- and 24-pound caliber.

Under the cover of night, the French mounted sorties with object of destroying the siege trenches. Mélac personally led several of these attacks. A French engineer officer named Rovère disguised himself and got within the Imperial lines, but he was found and captured on 8 July. The second parallel was opened on 21 June and the third parallel on 16 July. Mélac flooded the moat on 26 July. The three parallels were completed on 2 August and interconnected. By this date, the damage to the fortress walls could already be seen. Meanwhile, the besiegers overran the outworks one by one. In this situation, the French increasingly relied on buried mines within threatened outworks. When the Imperials stormed such a position, before retreating, the French would light the fuse and hope that many attackers would be blown up in the ensuing explosion. To prevent these losses, the Imperial engineers dug countermines.

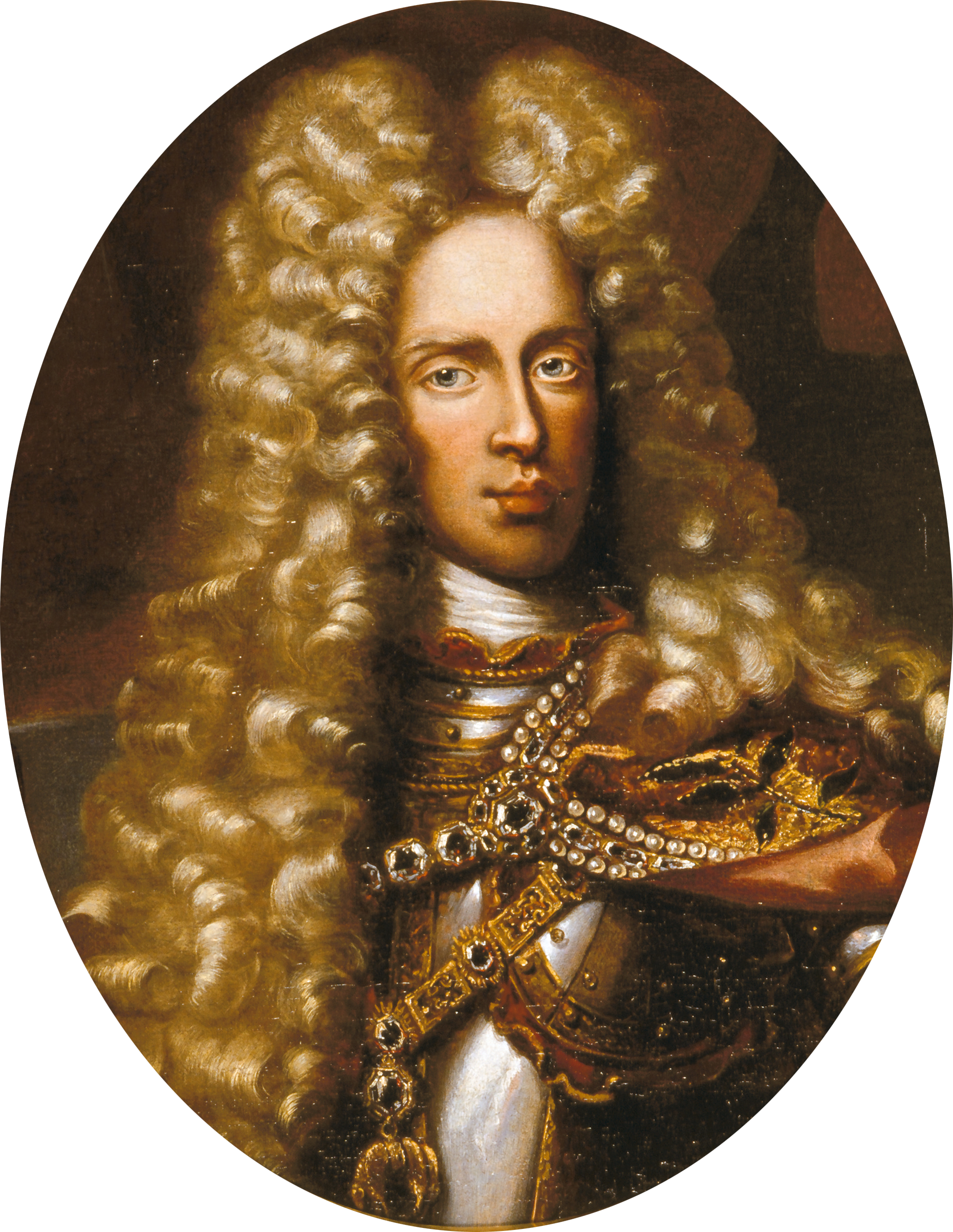
Archduke Joseph

Archduke Joseph, who later became the emperor, arrived at Landau with his entourage of 250 courtiers on 26 July. Joseph took nominal command of the army, while Louis of Baden continued to make all the critical decisions. Two days later, when the Imperial army paraded for the archduke's inspection, Mélac believed that a relief army under Catinat was at hand and he made preparations to defend against an assault. When the French commander finally realized what was going on, the frustrated Mélac sent a message asking where Joseph's headquarters was located so he could bombard it. Joseph, whose headquarters was out of range anyway, replied that the Frenchman must do his duty. The archduke visited the siege lines and even aimed some of the cannons. In one close call, Joseph was talking with a gunner when the man was hit in the chest by a bullet.

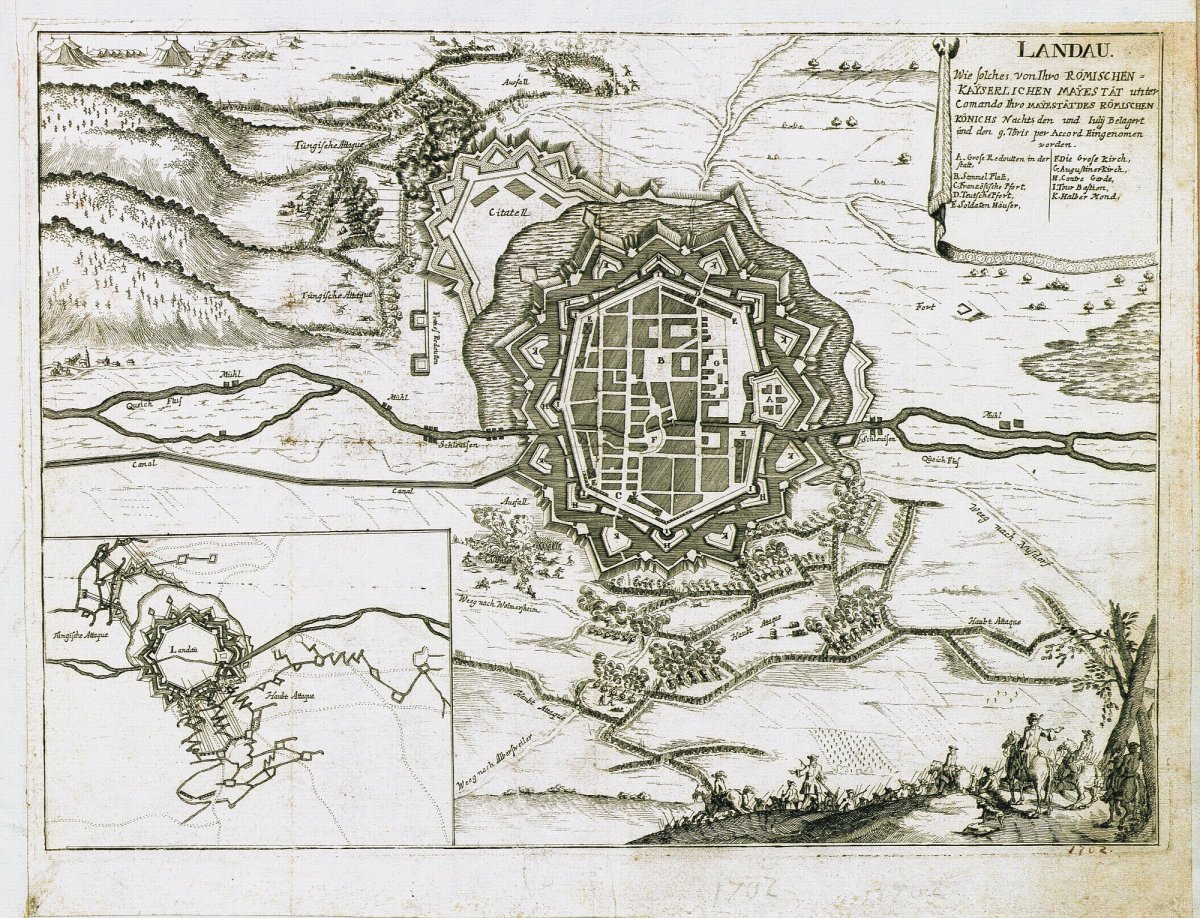
Map shows the 1702 attacks on Landau from the south and on the Crownwork from the northwest. The Queich flows through the city from west to east.

By early August, the besiegers had sapped within 30 paces of the counterscarp palisade. At 11:00 PM on 6 August a mine blew a gap in the counterscarp. Immediately, Thürheim, Count Herberstein and Louis Thomas, Count of Soissons led the assault column during a severe storm. Despite fierce resistance by the defenders, the Imperial troops seized a foothold in the covered way. At the same moment, some of Thüngen's troops led by George Frederick II, Margrave of Brandenburg-Ansbach and Prosper Ferdinand Philipp, Count of Fürstenberg-Stühlingen stormed the Crownwork, gaining a foothold in the counterscarp. The Imperial troops sustained casualties of 10 officers and 500 men while French losses were about the same. On 16 August the Count of Soissons was killed by a shell.

The French garrison ran low on cannon shot and musket balls. They stripped the lead from all windows in town to make bullets. There was plenty of flour for baking bread but a lack of other foodstuffs made the men's diet very poor. In order to pay his soldiers, Mélac melted down his personal silver plate. By this time there were only 1,800 French soldiers fit for duty. Another 900 were dead and 800 were in the hospital. King Louis XIV and his officials urged Catinat to march to the relief of Landau, but the old marshal refused, pleading low troop strength. A message from Catinat got through to Mélac with the news that no succor could be expected.

By 30 August the Imperial army established batteries on the glacis that were armed with 35 cannon and 23 mortars. These began blasting the ravelin walls in their front and managed to create a breach on 8 September. By this time the Crownwork was a pile of rubble. Believing that the Crownwork and its 800-man garrison were doomed if the Imperials mounted a serious assault, Mélac decided to abandon the position. On the night of 5 September the Crownwork was evacuated except for a token force of 120 men. Not realizing that the Crownwork was lightly held, the Imperial army made elaborate preparations for storming the place. The assault came on 8 September, preceded by the detonation of a mine under the Crownwork. The handful of defenders fired a volley, lit their own mine and withdrew to the fortress covered by the fire of two cannons. The attackers suffered heavy losses.

On 9 September Mélac convened a council of war at which it was determined to surrender the fortress. At noon that day the French commander raised the white flag and sent du Breuil to negotiate the terms. On the 10th Louis of Baden and Mélac signed the articles of capitulation after which Louis commended his foe for his energetic defense. The French survivors were allowed to march out with drums beating and colors flying. They were given free passage to the French lines and allowed to keep their personal weapons, baggage, two mortars and one 6-pound, one 12-pound and two 24-pound cannons. On 12 September the French began marching home, escorted by a battalion of infantry and 300 cavalry.

== Results ==
Aside from possession of the fortress, the Imperial army was only able to salvage 46 cannon and 19 mortars; the rest of the ordnance was ruined. An Imperial garrison of six battalions under Count Friesen was installed in Landau. Archduke Joseph and his wife toured the city on 17 September before returning to Vienna. Landau's population suffered badly. Many houses were destroyed and the merchants had supplied the soldiers without reimbursement. In September the Electorate of Bavaria entered the war as an ally of France and captured Ulm. Louis of Baden had hoped to conquer Alsace, but instead he crossed to the east bank of the Rhine to protect the Imperial states in south Germany. Catinat placed a small army in the hands of Claude Louis Hector de Villars and sent him to the east bank. On 14 October 1702 Villars defeated Louis at the Battle of Friedlingen.

In 1703 the Imperial position degraded badly due to the Samuel Oppenheimer bankruptcy and fiscal mismanagement. Louis of Baden complained that his troops were not properly paid but was unable to resolve the problem. Meanwhile, Villars' army cleared the Breisgau of Imperial troops and captured Kehl on 9 March 1703. Camille d'Hostun, duc de Tallard marched from the Moselle River with another army to join Villars. Blocked from moving north by Louis of Baden at the Lines of Stollhofen, Villars moved east to link hands with France's new ally, Maximilian II Emanuel, Elector of Bavaria. Louis abandoned the Lines of Weissenburg to the French without a battle. The stage was set for Tallard to try to recover Landau from the Imperial army.
