= Louis Thomas, Count of Soissons =

Louis Thomas
- Count of Soissons
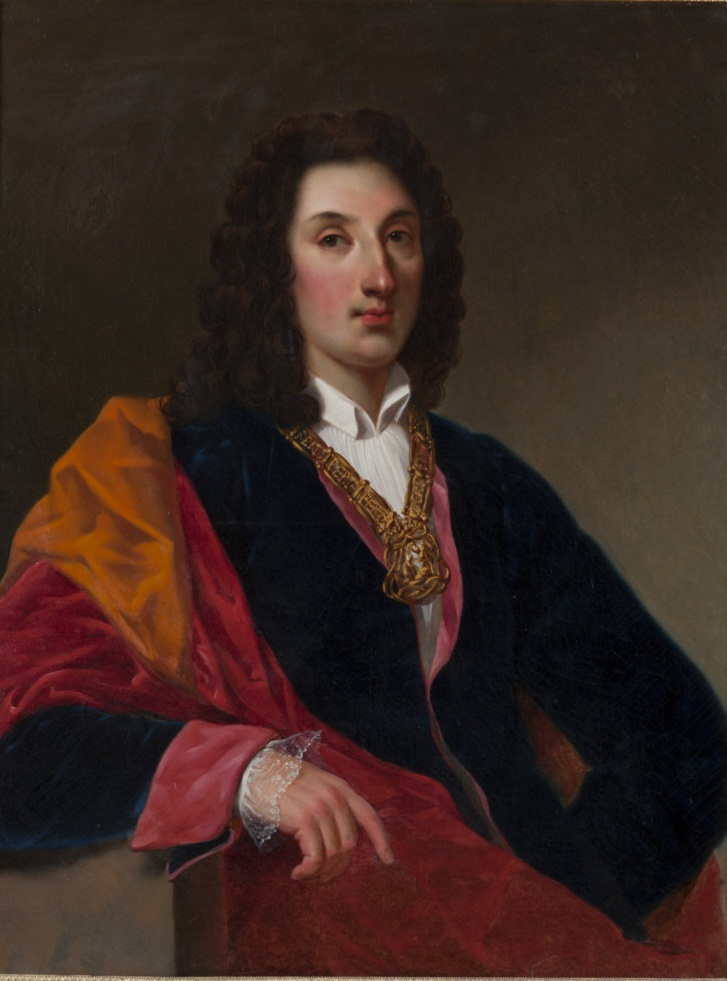
- Louis Thomas of Savoy, Count of Soissons.
- Born: 15 December 1657; Paris, France
- Died: 14 August 1702 (aged 44); Near Landau
- Spouse: Uranie de La Cropte de Beauvais
- Issue Detail: Maria Anna Victoria of Savoy-Carignano, Duchess of Saxe-Hildburghausen; Emmanuel Thomas, Count of Soissons
Names
- Luigi Tommaso di Savoia
- House: Savoy-Carignano
- Father: Eugene Maurice, Count of Soissons
- Mother: Olympia Mancini

Prince Louis Thomas of Savoy-Carignano (German: Ludwig Thomas von Savoyen-Carignan, Graf von Soissons; Italian: Luigi Tommaso di Savoia-Carignano, conte di Soissons; 15 December 1657 – 14 August 1702) was a Count of Soissons, bearing from birth an honorary princely title in the cadet line of the House of Savoy. He was killed as Feldzeugmeister of the Imperial Army at the Siege of Landau at the start of the War of the Spanish Succession.

== Biography ==
Louis Thomas was the eldest son of Eugene Maurice, Count of Soissons, and Olympia Mancini, as well as the oldest brother of Prince Eugene of Savoy. He married Uranie de La Cropte de Beauvais (1655–1717), whom Saint-Simon had once described as "radiant as the glorious morn". His daughter Princess Maria Anna Victoria of Savoy eventually inherited Prince Eugene's huge estate. His maternal cousins included the Duke of Vendôme as well as the Duke of Bouillon and Louis Henri de La Tour d'Auvergne. His paternal cousins included Victor Amadeus I, Prince of Carignano, Louis William, Margrave of Baden-Baden, son of his aunt Louise of Savoy, and Maximilian II Emanuel, Elector of Bavaria, son of another Savoy Princess and thus just a third cousin of his.

After the premature death of his father in 1673 and the flight of his mother to Brussels due to her involvement in the notorious Poison affair, Louis Thomas and his siblings remained in Paris and were entrusted to the care of their grim grandmother Marie de Bourbon and their aunt Princess Louise of Savoy, Margravine of Baden Baden. Since the family had fallen out of favour with the king because of Olympia Mancini's behaviour, Louis-Thomas inherited the titles of his fathers, but not his offices and thus his income. His sisters and daughters remained unmarried, his brothers Louis-Jules (1660–1683) and Emanuel-Philibert (1662–1676) and his son Thomas Emmanuel pursued their military careers outside France, as did his other two brothers that had initially been directed to ecclesiastical careers, Philip (1659–1693), who died fighting for the Venetians against the Turks, and Prince Eugene of Savoy, who became one of the most famous generals in the service of the House of Habsburg.

Louis Thomas obtained a commission as an officer in the French Army, but Louis XIV had amorous designs on his wife, Uranie de La Cropte de Beauvais. The latter, however, spurned the king's romantic advances. Angered, Louis dismissed Louis Thomas from the army, and, when Louis Thomas sought a position abroad, terminated his pension and dues. In 1699, all but bankrupt, Louis Thomas sought the aid of Prince Eugene, in Vienna. With Eugene's help, he obtained a commission in the Austrian Imperial Army.

On 18 August, Louis was killed by a French bomb at the Siege of Landau at the onset of the War of the Spanish Succession.

== Issue ==
1. Princess Maria Anna Victoria of Savoy (1683–1763), Mademoiselle de Soissons; married Prince Joseph of Saxe-Hildburghausen, Duke in Saxony, son of Ernest, Duke of Saxe-Hildburghausen; had no issue.
2. Prince Louis Thomas of Savoy (15 December 1685 – 28 September 1695) died aged 10.
3. Princess Thérèse Anne Louise of Savoy (15 September 1686– 22 January 1736); never married and had no issue.
4. Prince Emmanuel Thomas of Savoy (1687–1729); succeeded as Count of Soissons. He married Princess Maria Theresia of Liechtenstein and had issue.
5. Prince Maurice of Savoy (10 January 1690 – 18 September 1710) never married or had issue.
6. Prince Eugene of Savoy (23 September 1692 – 23 November 1712) died young without issue.

He has often been credited with being the natural father of historical novelist Marguerite de Lussan, born either to an unknown courtesan or to a fortune teller named La Fleury, the latter theory appearing to be preferred by "modern research". At any rate, the prince "took a special interest in her education and permitted her to bear his arms", and she remained on friendly terms with her alleged uncle, Prince Eugene of Savoy.

== Bibliography ==
- von Arneth, Alfred Ritter (1864). Prinz Eugen von Savoyen. Nach den handschriftlichen Quellen der kaiserlichen Archive (in German). Vol. 1. 1663–1707. Vienna: Braumüller.
- Bianchi, Paola (2018). "SAVOIA SOISSONS, Eugenio Maurizio". Dizionario Biografico degli Italiani (in Italian). Vol. 91. Rome: Istituto dell'Enciclopedia Italiana.
- Braubach, Max (1950). Geschichte und Abenteuer. Gestalten um den Prinzen Eugen (in German). Munich: Verlag Bruckmann.
- Le Tellier, François-Michel (2007). Salat, Nicole; Sarmant, Thierry (eds.). Lettres de Louvois à Louis XIV, 1679-1691 : politique, guerre et fortification au grand siècle (in French). Société de l'histoire de France. ISBN 978-2354071042.
