= Princess Maria Theresia of Liechtenstein =

Princess Maria Theresia
- Countess of Soissons
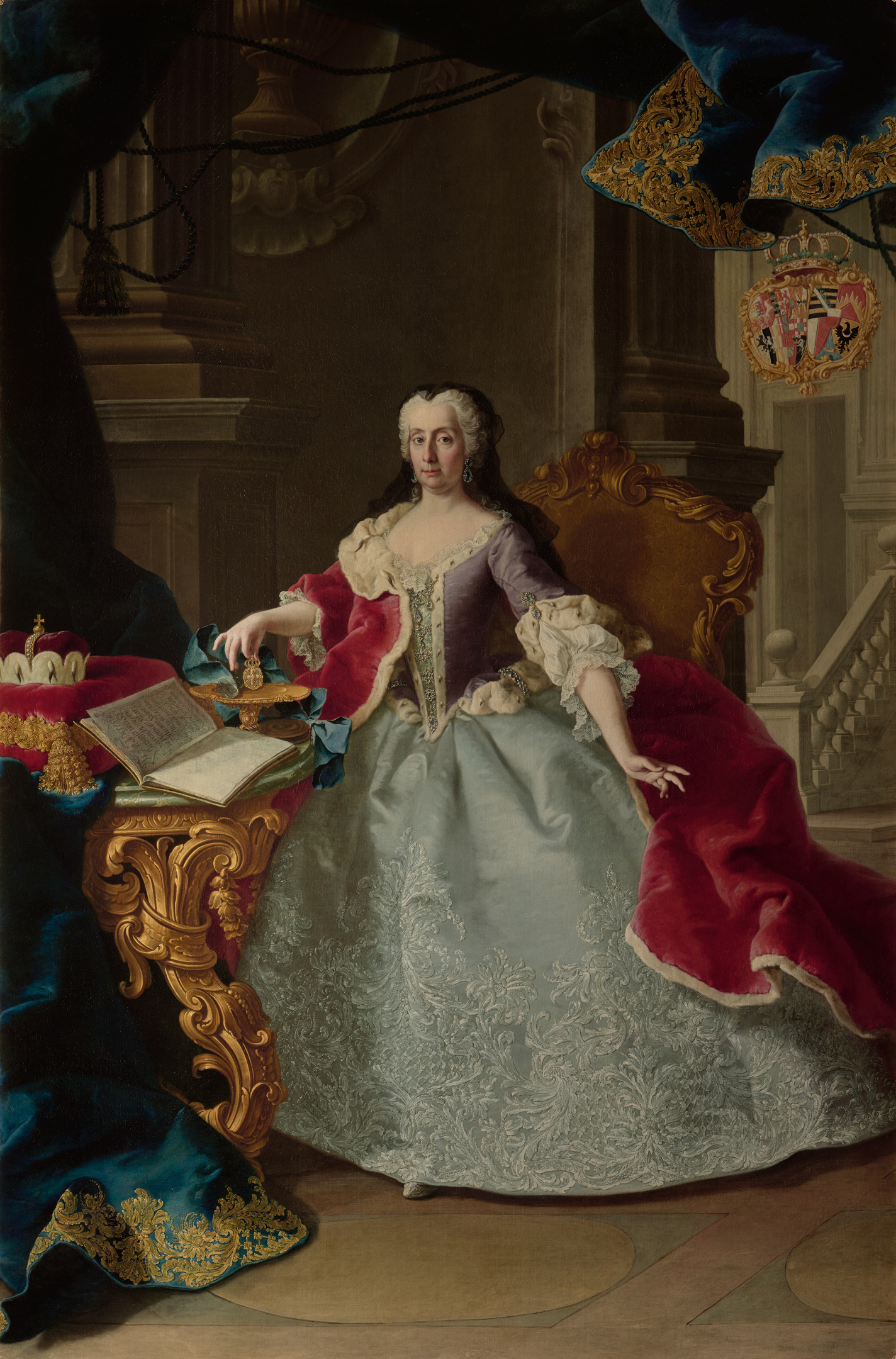
- Portrait by Martin van Meytens, c. 1750
- Born: 11 May 1694
- Died: 20 February 1772 (aged 77); Vienna, Austria
- Spouse: Thomas Emmanuel, Count of Soissons (m. 1713; died 1729)
- Issue Detail: Eugene Jean, Count of Soissons
Names
- Maria Theresia Anna Felicitas von und zu Liechtenstein
- House: Liechtenstein
- Father: Hans-Adam I, Prince of Liechtenstein
- Mother: Princess Edmunda of Dietrichstein-Nikolsburg

Princess Maria Theresia of Liechtenstein (Maria Theresia Anna Felicitas; 11 May 1694 – 20 February 1772) was the heiress to the Silesian Duchy of Troppau (now Opava in Czech Republic). Countess of Soissons by marriage, she was the last person to hold the title. She had one son who predeceased her in 1734.

== Biography ==
Maria Theresia's father was Prince Hans-Adam I of Liechtenstein – who purchased the counties of Vaduz and Schellenberg, to form which is the modern state of Liechtenstein (although the first Prince to visit Vaduz did so only in 1844). Her mother, Erdmuthe Maria Theresia of Dietrichstein was the great-granddaughter of Adam von Dietrichstein (1527–1590), Hofmeister to the court of Emperor Rudolf II and buried in St Vitus Cathedral, Prague Castle.

Maria Theresia's father died in 1712 – and both her brothers before that. The main line of the family thus died out, and was replaced, in the princely title of Liechtenstein, by a collateral branch. However, Hans-Adam I passed on to his daughter the ducal title of Troppau (to which Salic law evidently did not apply).

On 24 October 1713, in Vienna, Maria Theresia married Thomas Emmanuel of Savoy-Carignano, Count of Soissons and Governor of Antwerp (born on 8 December 1687), the only surviving nephew of famous Prince Eugene of Savoy, who had played a key role in arranging the marriage. Through it she became a Princess of Savoy, having married into the House of Savoy-Carignano, the principal cadet branch of the House of Savoy—which had recently taken over the Kingdom of Sicily—and, more specifically, into the further cadet line of Savoy-Carignano-Soissons, styled after Marie de Bourbon, Countess of Soissons, wife of the first Prince of Carignano.

After her husband died in Vienna on 28 December 1729, Maria Theresia made Škvorec Castle her seat and never remarried.

The marriage had produced only one child, Eugene Jean, in 1714, who remained in the care of his great-uncle Eugene of Savoy. He was the latter's only male relative left in the descending line and therefore his sole heir. In an effort to establish a new small Savoy state for him in central Italy, the Prince arranged his marriage to Maria Teresa Cybo-Malaspina, Duchess of Massa and Carrara, who was still a child at the time. The betrothal was concluded in Vienna in 1732, but no marriage ensued due to the young man's premature death in Mannheim in 1734.

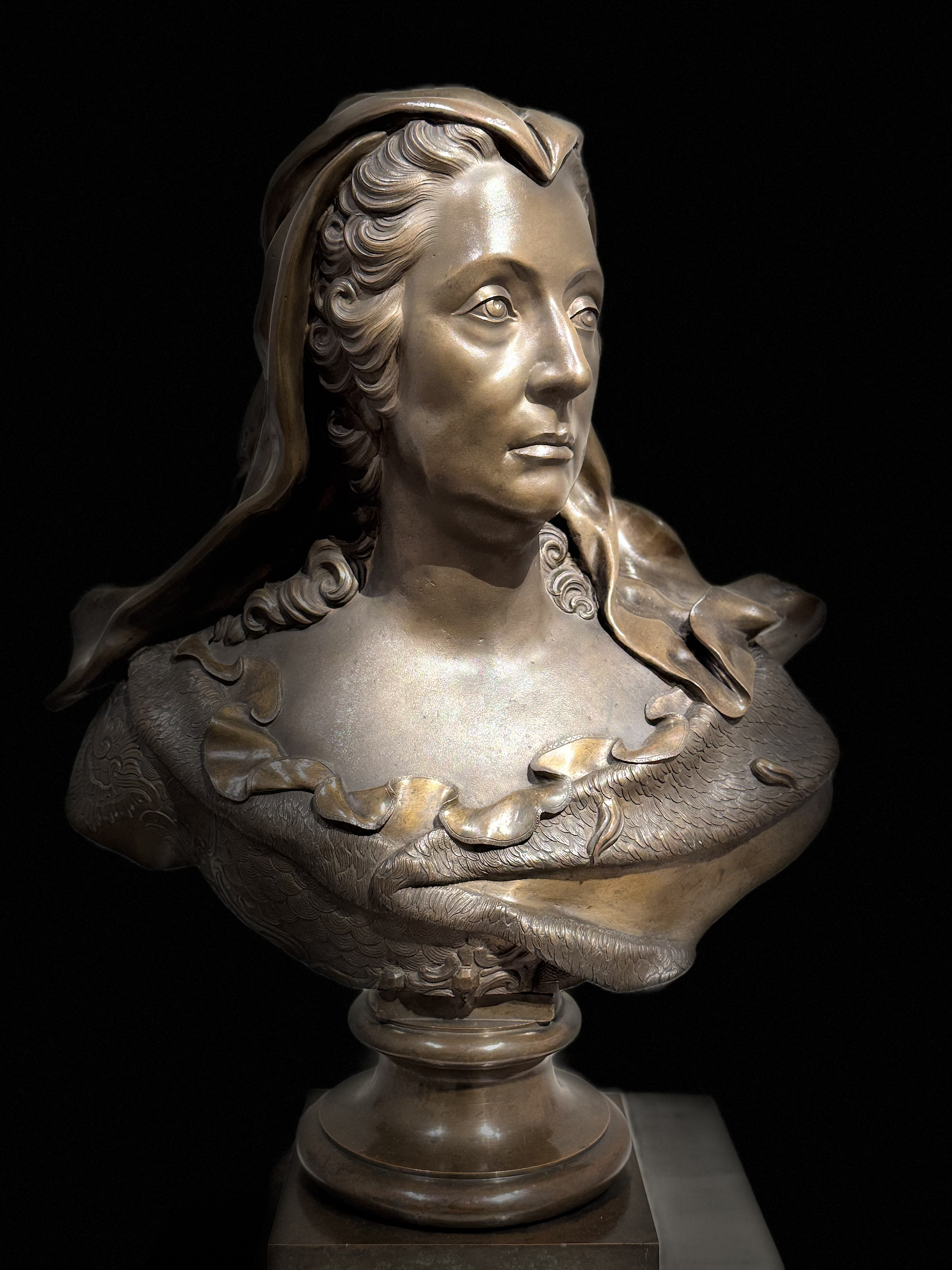
Balthasar Ferdinand Moll. Maria Theresia of Liechtenstein. 1750/51

On 20 February 1772 Maria Theresia died in Vienna. Having no legitimate heirs, she willed her considerable estate, including the Duchy of Troppau, to reigning Prince of Liechtenstein, Franz Joseph I. The title of Count of Soissons had become extinct with her young son's death and had reverted to the French crown.

== Issue ==
- Eugène Jean François de Savoie (Eugene John Francis; 23 September 1714 – 24 November 1734); married Maria Teresa Cybo-Malaspina by proxy but died 13 days after without issue.
