= Sainte-Radegonde, Gironde =

Sainte-Radegonde
- Commune
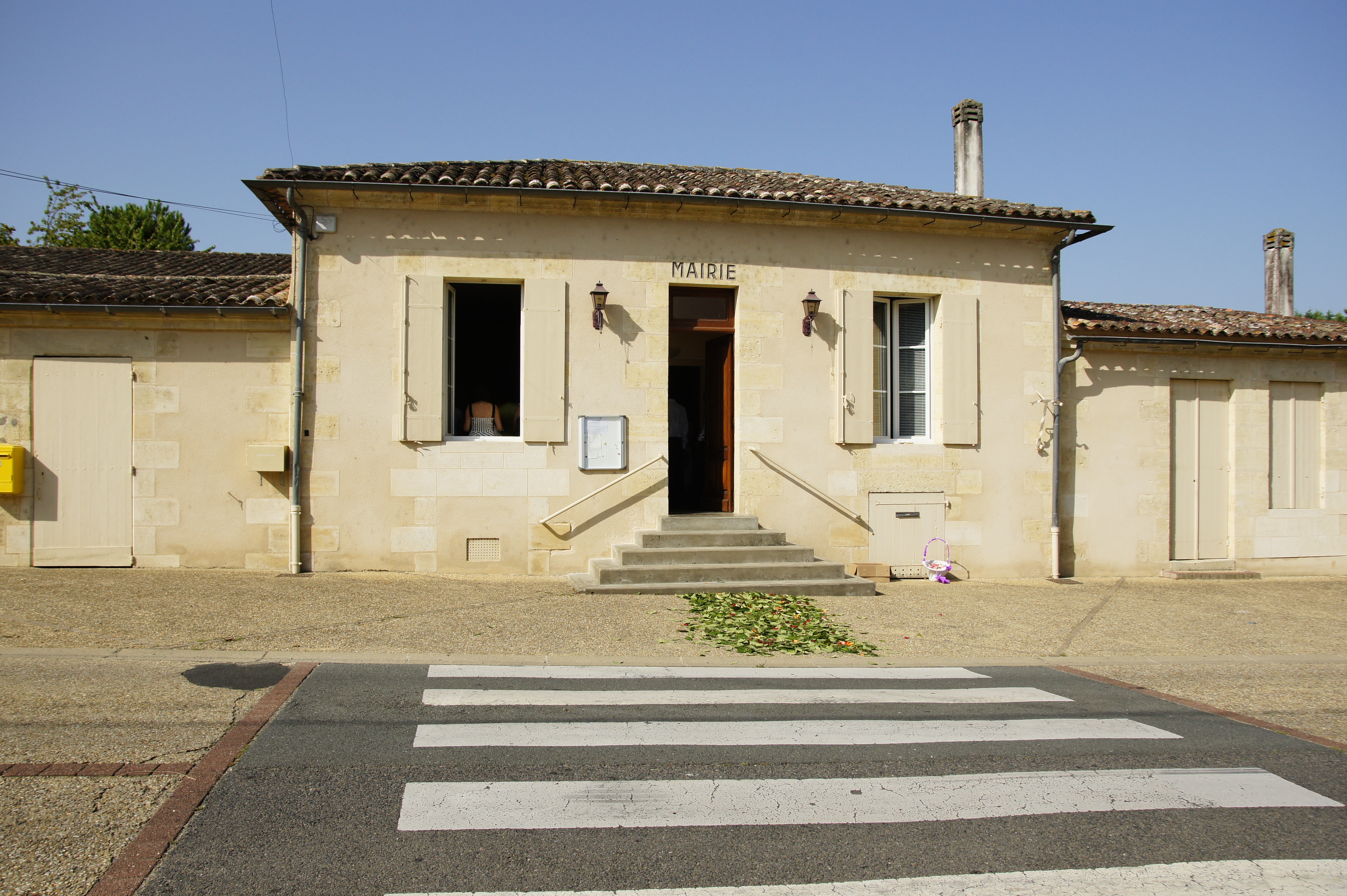
- Town hall
- Location of Sainte-Radegonde
- Location within France Location within Nouvelle-Aquitaine
- Coordinates: 44°48′24″N 0°00′59″E
- Country: France
- Region: Nouvelle-Aquitaine
- Department: Gironde
- Arrondissement: Libourne
- Canton: Les Coteaux de Dordogne
- Intercommunality: Castillon Pujols

Government
  - Mayor (2023–2026): Jean-Claude Guillaume
- Area^{1}: 12.48 km^{2} (4.82 sq mi)
- Elevation: 97 m (318 ft)
- Highest elevation: 118 m (387 ft)
- Lowest elevation: 9 m (30 ft)
- Population (2023): 408
  - Density: 32.7/km^{2} (84.7/sq mi)
- Time zone: UTC+01:00 (CET)
  - Summer (DST): UTC+02:00 (CEST)
- INSEE/Postal code: 33468 /33350
- ^{1} French Land Register data, which excludes lakes, ponds, glaciers > 1 km^{2} (0.386 sq mi or 247 acres) and river estuaries.

Sainte-Radegonde (French pronunciation: [sɛ̃t ʁadɡɔ̃d]; Occitan: Senta Radegonda) is a commune in the Gironde department in Nouvelle-Aquitaine in southwestern France.

== Population ==
Historical population
Year	Pop.	±% p.a.
1968	452	—
1975	354	−3.43%
1982	364	+0.40%
1990	426	+1.99%
1999	438	+0.31%
2007	468	+0.83%
2012	466	−0.09%
2017	457	−0.39%
2023	408	−1.87%
Source: INSEE

== See also ==
- Communes of the Gironde department
