= Princess Maria Anna Victoria of Savoy =

Italian noblewoman

Princess Maria Anna Victoria
- Princess of Saxe-Hilburghausen
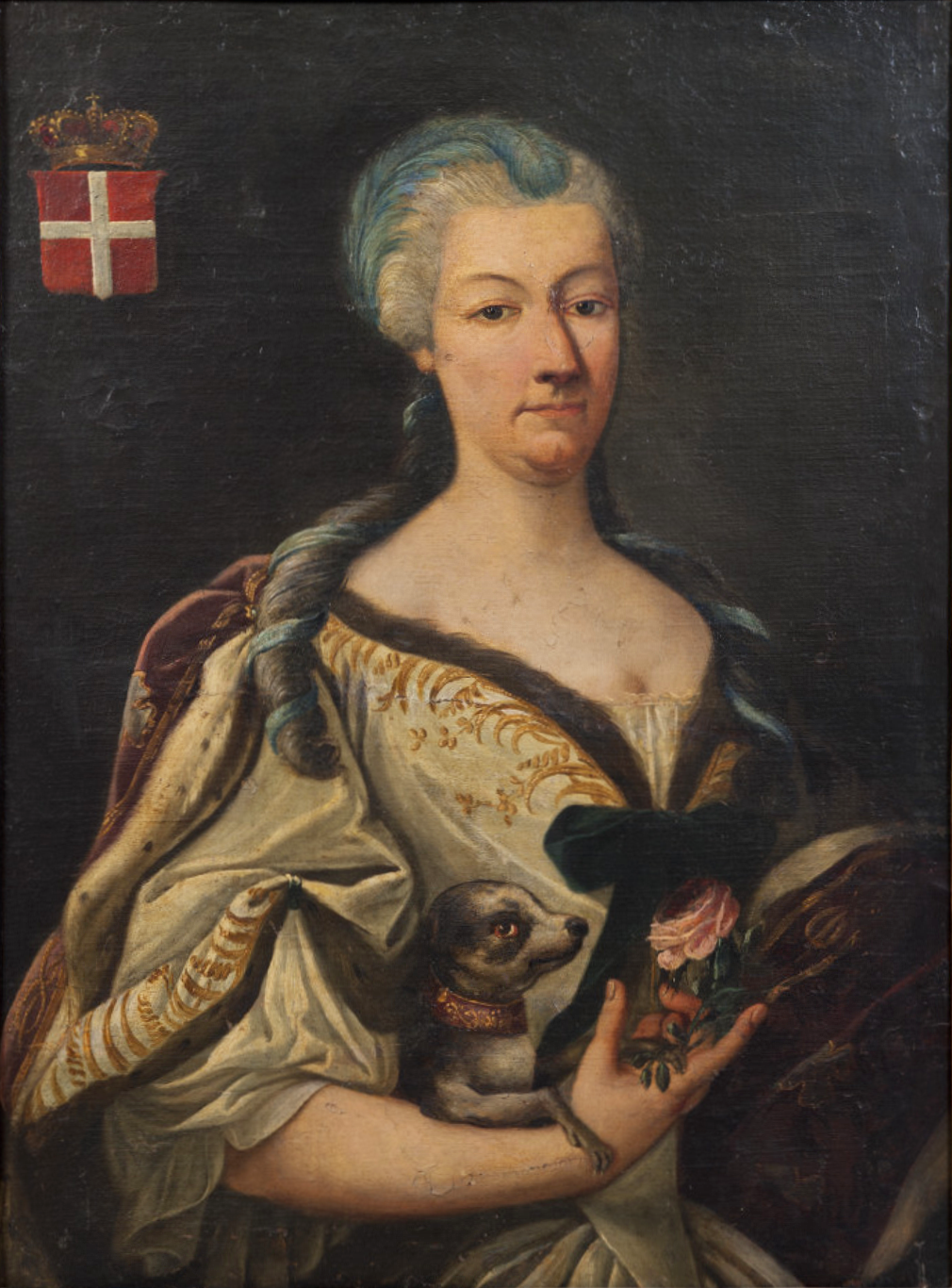
- Portrait of Princess Maria Anna Vittoria of Savoy, Castle of Racconigi
- Born: 10 November 1686
- Died: 11 October 1763 (aged 76); Turin, Savoyard state
- Spouse: Prince Joseph of Saxe-Hildburghausen (m. 1738; div. 1757)
- House: House of Savoy-Carignano (by birth); House of Saxe-Hildburghausen (by marriage)
- Father: Louis Thomas, Count of Soissons
- Mother: Uranie de La Cropte de Beauvais

Princess Maria Anna Victoria of Savoy (German: Maria Anna Victoria von Savoyen, (French: Marie Anne Victoire de Savoie); 11 September 1683 – 11 October 1763) was the daughter of Prince Louis Thomas of Savoy, Count of Soissons, and his wife, Uranie de La Cropte de Beauvais.

== Biography ==
As the daughter of Louis Thomas, Count of Soissons, she was styled Mademoiselle de Soissons or Mademoiselle de Carignan prior to her marriage. At the age of twenty-two, her father, Louis Thomas, secretly married Uranie de La Cropte de Beauvais, a woman far below his social rank; following his death, Uranie retired to a monastery. Maria Anna Victoria was the niece of Prince Eugene of Savoy, the great general and statesman of imperial Austria, a patron of the arts whom she had never met.

Upon Prince Eugene's sudden death in 1736, without a will or testament, Maria Anna Victoria as his closest relative inherited his immense possessions in Austria, which she then proceeded to quickly sell off at cut rate prices. His mansions, vast art collections (with an estimated 400 pictures), antique furniture, old masters, statues, even his wartime medals, the sword given to him by Anne, Queen of Great Britain, for his part in the War of the Spanish Succession and the portrait given to him by Emperor Joseph were sold; nothing was spared. Only his library and his favourite palace, the Belvedere were purchased by the Emperor, while Schloss Hof and the Stadtpalais went to Maria Theresa.

The bitterness of every Austrian against Maria Anna Victoria as she proceeded with the liquidation was expressed in a couplet which was pinned on her door:

Est-il possible que du prince Eugene la gloire
Soit ternie par une si vilaine Victoire

Is it possible, that Prince Eugene’s glory
Be tarnished by such a bad Victoria

On 17 April 1738, fifty-two-year-old Princess Maria Anna Victoria married Prince Joseph of Saxe-Hildburghausen, a German officer and Feldzeugmeister in the Imperial Army who was sixteen years her junior. She brought a substantial dowry to the marriage, and the couple became known for hosting numerous social events. Though they never divorced, the union ended in separation in 1752 after Saxe-Hildburghausen was said to have fled dishonourably. The couple had no children.

== Death ==
She then lived for a time in France, and eventually died in Turin, Italy, in 1763 at the age of 76.

== Sources ==
- de Saint-Allais, N.V. (1817). Nobiliaire universel de France: ou Recueil général des généalogies historiques des maisons nobles de ce royaume (in French). Bachelin-Deflorenne.
- Henderson, N. (2002). Prince Eugen of Savoy: A Biography. A Phoenix Press Paperback. Phoenix. ISBN 978-1-84212-597-7.
- McKay, D.; Baker, D.V.; von Savoyen, E.P. (1977). Prince Eugene of Savoy. Men in office. Thames and Hudson. ISBN 978-0-500-87007-5.
- Markus, G. (2014). Alles nur Zufall?: Schicksalsstunden großer Österreicher (in German). Amalthea Signum Verlag. ISBN 978-3-902862-98-3.
- Mraz, G.; Nemec, H. (1988). Belvedere: Schloss und Park des Prinzen Eugen (in German). Herder. ISBN 978-3-210-24871-4.
- Vehse, C.E.; Demmler, F.K.F. (1856). Memoirs of the Court, Aristocracy, and Diplomacy of Austria. Memoirs of the Court, Aristocracy, and Diplomacy of Austria. Longman, Brown, Green, and Longmans.
