= Thomas Emmanuel, Prince of Savoy-Carignan =

Prince of Savoy (1687–1729)

Thomas Emmanuel of Savoy
- Count of Soissons
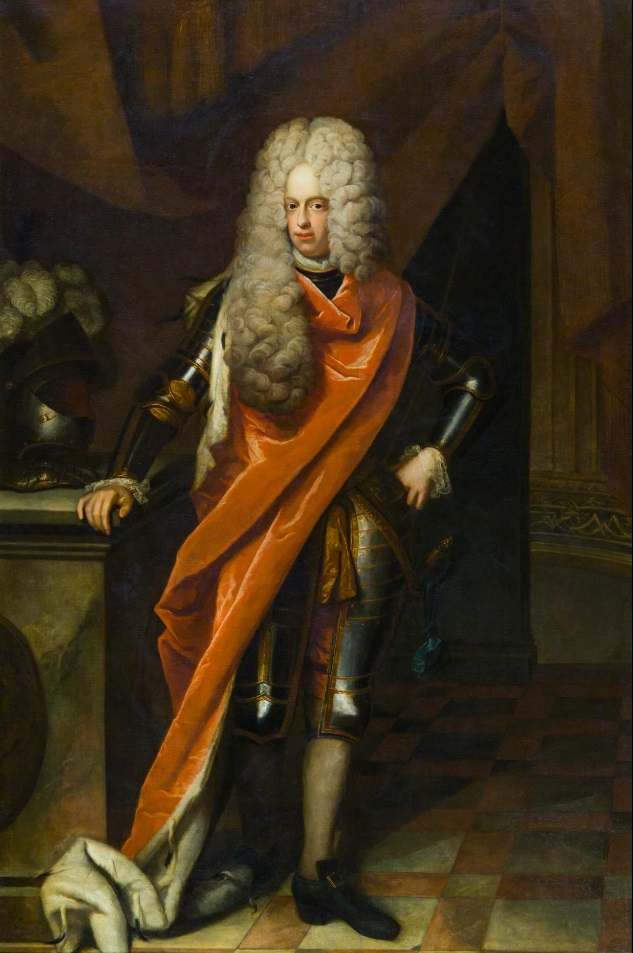
- Portrait by David Richer the Elder, 1713
- Born: 8 December 1687
- Died: 28 December 1729 (aged 42); Vienna
- Noble family: Savoy-Carignano
- Spouse: Princess Maria Theresia of Liechtenstein
- Issue: Eugene Jean, Count of Soissons
- Father: Louis Thomas, Count of Soissons
- Mother: Uranie de La Cropte

Prince Thomas Emmanuel of Savoy (8 December 1687 – 28 December 1729), was born a Prince of Savoy and was later Count of Soissons from 1702 till his death.

== Early life ==
He was the son of Prince Louis Thomas of Savoy (1657–1702) and his wife, Uranie de La Cropte (1655-1717). The famous general Prince Eugene of Savoy was his uncle.

== Marriage ==
He married on 24 October 1713 Princess Maria Theresia of Liechtenstein (1694–1772), Duchess of Troppau and had one son. He became a Knight in the Austrian Order of the Golden Fleece in 1712. He died in Vienna.

== Issue ==
- Eugène-Jean-François de Savoie (Eugene John Francis; 23 September 1714 – 24 November 1734); in 1732 he was engaged to the 7-year-old Duchess Maria Teresa Cybo-Malaspina, Sovereign of the Duchy of Massa and Carrara, but the marriage could not ensue due to his death two years later.

== Ancestry ==
Ancestors of Thomas Emmanuel, Prince of Savoy-Carignan

16. Charles Emmanuel I, Duke of Savoy
8. Thomas Francis, Prince of Carignano
17. Infanta Catalina Micaela of Spain
4. Eugene Maurice, Count of Soissons
18. Charles, Count of Soissons
9. Marie de Bourbon, Countess of Soissons
19. Anne de Montafié, Countess of Clermont-en-Beauvaisis
2. Louis Thomas, Count of Soissons
20. Paolo Mancini
10. Lorenzo Mancini
21. Vittoria Capocci
5. Olympia Mancini
22. Pietro Mazzarini
11. Girolama Mazzarini
23. Ortensia Bufalini
1. Prince Emmanuel Thomas of Savoy
24. Arnaud de La Cropte, Lord of Chanteirac
12. Charles de La Cropte, Lord of Chanteirac
25. Marie Massin
6. François Paul de La Cropte, Lord of Beauvais
26. Jacques d'Auzaneau, Lord of Musset
13. Isabeau d'Auzaneau
27. Marie de Labat
3. Uranie de La Cropte
28. Isaac Martel, Count of Marennes, Lord of Lindebeuf
14. Gédéon Martel, Count of Marennes
29. Élisabeth Puchot de Gerponville
7. Charlotte Martel, Lady of Tonnay-Boutonne
30. Charles de La Mothe-Fouqué, Lord of Saint-Surin
15. Élisabeth de La Mothe-Fouqué
31. Élisabeth de la Cassaigne, Lady of Tonnay-Boutonne
