= Hans-Adam I of Liechtenstein =

Prince of Liechtenstein from 1684 to 1712

Hans-Adam I
- Duke of Troppau and Jägerndorf
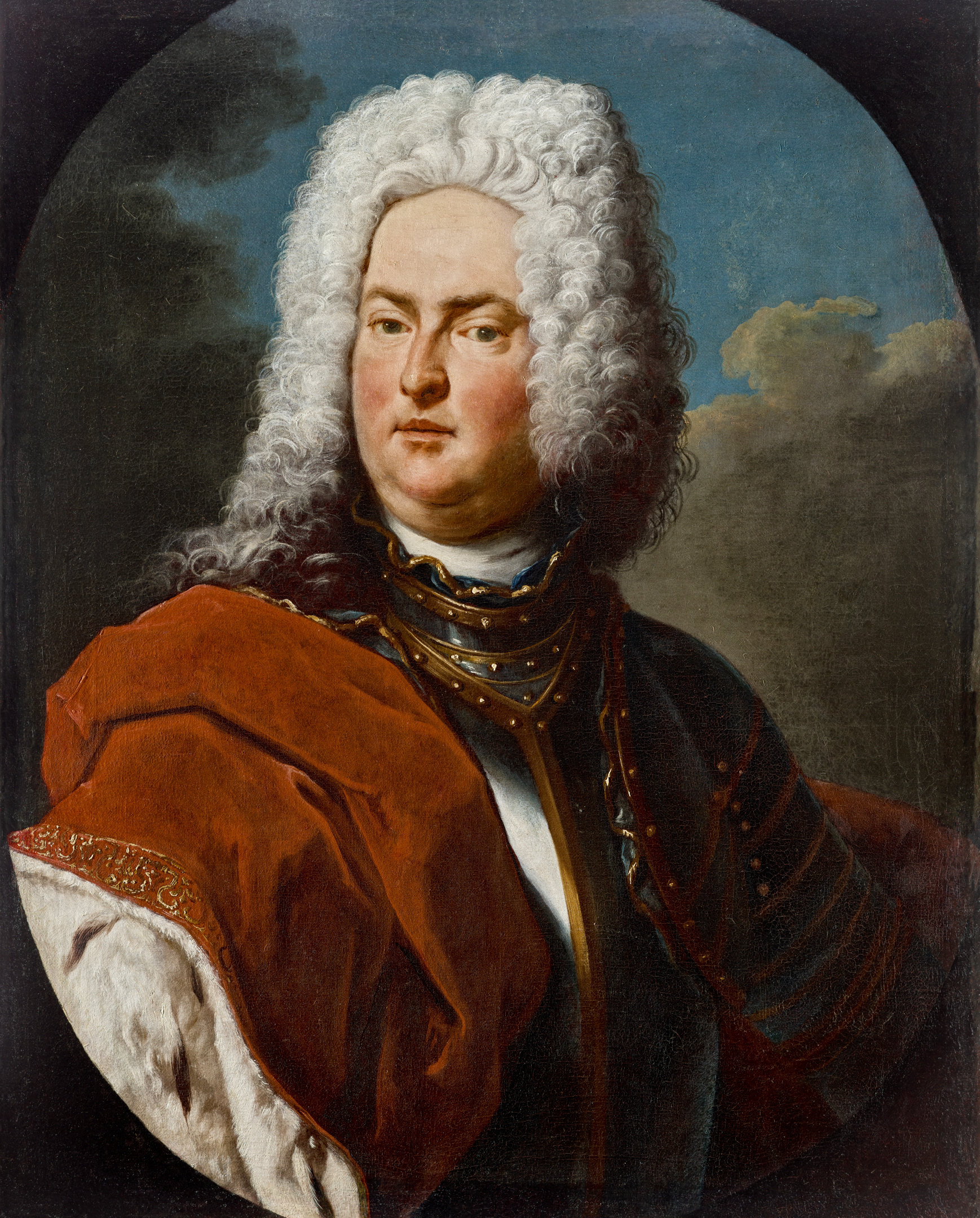
- Portrait by Peter van Roy, c. 1706

Prince of Liechtenstein
- Reign: 5 April 1684 – 16 June 1712
- Predecessor: Karl Eusebius
- Successor: Joseph Wenzel I
- Born: 16 August 1662; Brno, Moravia, Kingdom of Bohemia
- Died: 16 June 1712 (aged 49); Vienna, Archduchy of Austria
- Burial: Church of the Nativity of the Virgin Mary, Brno
- Spouse: Princess Edmunda Maria of Dietrichstein-Nikolsburg (m. 1681)
- Issue: Princess Maria Elisabeth; Prince Franz Dominik; Maria Theresia, Countess of Soissons; Princess Maria
Names
- Johann Adam Andreas
- House: Liechtenstein
- Father: Karl Eusebius, Prince of Liechtenstein
- Mother: Johanna Beatrix of Dietrichstein
- Religion: Roman Catholic

Hans-Adam I (Johann Adam Andreas; 16 August 1662 – 16 June 1712) was the son of Karl Eusebius, Prince of Liechtenstein (1611–1684) and Princess Johanna Beatrix of Dietrichstein (1625–1676).

On 18 January 1699, he acquired the Lordship of Schellenberg, and on 22 February 1712, the County of Vaduz. These two domains would later form the present principality of Liechtenstein. He was also Duke of Troppau and Krnov.

Johann did not take up an office at the Imperial court but did case-by-case work, especially as a financial expert. He was known informally as Hans Adam the Rich. Besides managing his property, he took a great interest in art. He bought works by Rubens and van Dyck for his collections and was one of the most generous patrons of his time.

Johann created two memorials to himself, a palace in Bankgasse in Vienna and a summer palace in Rossau. He was the 575th Knight of the Order of the Golden Fleece in Austria.

== Marriage and issue ==
Johann married his first cousin, Erdmuthe Maria Theresia of Dietrichstein, Princess of Dietrichstein-Nikolsburg (17 April 1652 – 15 March 1737) on 16 February 1681. They had seven children:

- Princess Maria Elisabeth (8 May 1683 – 4 May 1744), married Leopold, Duke of Schleswig-Holstein-Sonderburg-Wiesenburg, son of Karolina of Legnica-Brieg
- Prince Karl Joseph (15 October 1684 – 16 February 1704) died aged 19 without issue.
- Princess Maria Antonia (10 April 1687 – 9 October 1750) married Márk Adam Czober and had issue.
- Prince Franz Dominik (1 September 1689 – 19 March 1711) died unmarried and without issue.
- Princess Maria Gabriele (12 July 1692 – 7 November 1713), married Joseph Johann Adam, Prince of Liechtenstein
- Princess Maria Theresia (11 May 1694 – 20 February 1772)
- Princess Maria Dominika (5 August 1698 – 2 June 1724) married Heinrich Josef Anton, Prince of Auersperg

He left no male heirs at his death, both of his sons having died before him.

Hans-Adam I of Liechtenstein House of Liechtenstein Born: 1657 Died: 1712
Regnal titles
Preceded by Karl Eusebius	Prince of Liechtenstein; 1684–1712	Succeeded by Joseph Wenzel I
