= Karl Eusebius, Prince of Liechtenstein =

Prince of Liechtenstein from 1627 to 1684

Karl Eusebius
- Duke of Troppau and Jägerndorf
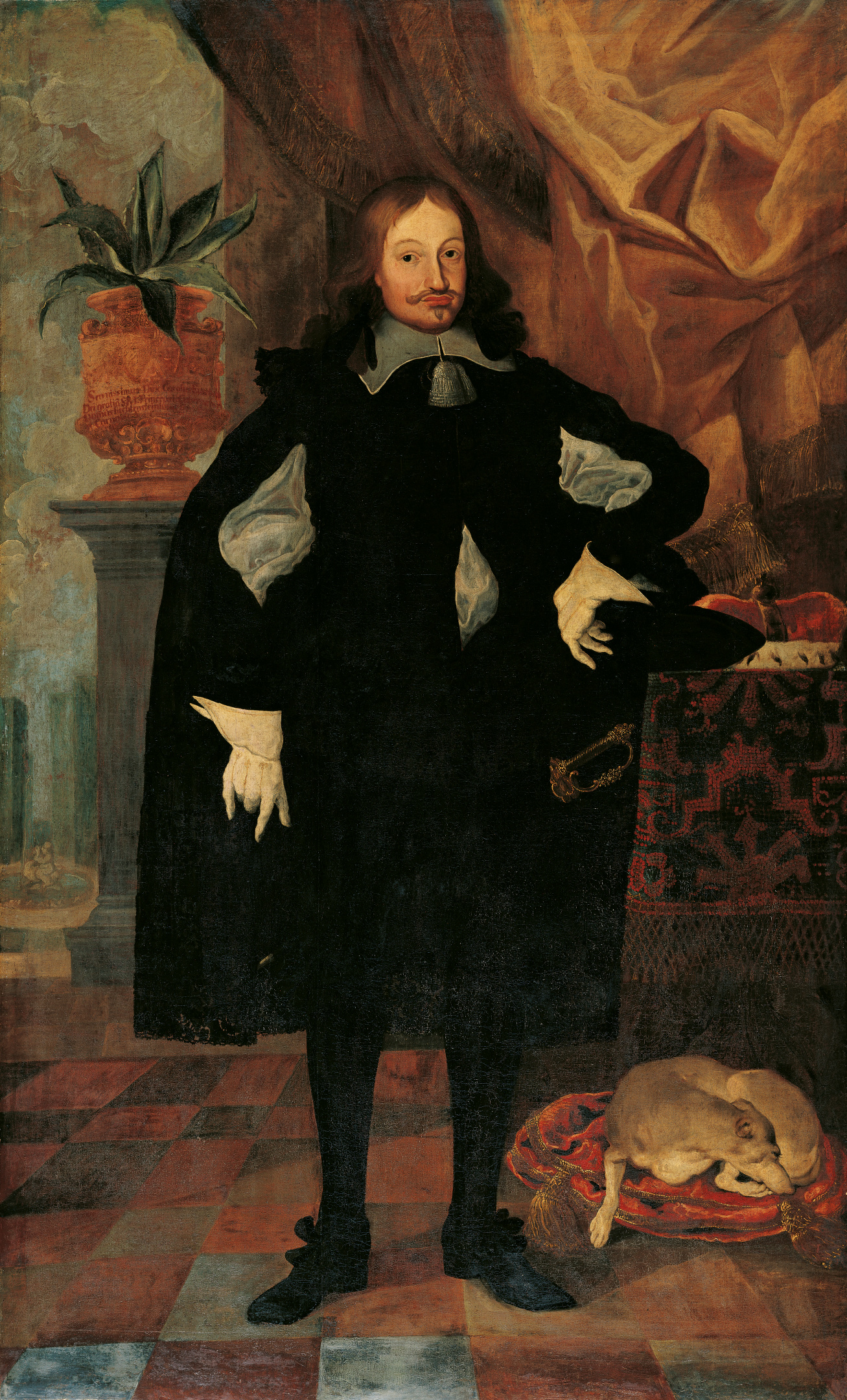
- Portrait, 1640

Prince of Liechtenstein
- Reign: 12 February 1627 – 5 April 1684
- Predecessor: Karl I
- Successor: Hans-Adam I
- Born: 11 April 1611
- Died: 5 April 1684 (aged 72); Schwarzkosteletz
- Burial: Church of the Nativity of the Virgin Mary, Brno
- Spouse: Princess Johanna Beatrix of Dietrichstein-Nikolsburg (m. 1644; died 1676)
- Issue: 9, including Hans-Adam I, Prince of Liechtenstein and Eleonora Maria Rosalia of Troppau and Jägerndorf
- House: Liechtenstein
- Father: Karl I, Prince of Liechtenstein
- Mother: Baroness Anna Maria Šemberová of Boskovic and Černá Hora
- Religion: Catholic

Karl Eusebius (11 April 1611 – 5 April 1684) was the Prince of Liechtenstein. He inherited this title in 1627 from his father Karl I. He was 16 and thus considered underage, and his uncles Prince Gundakar and Maximillian acted as regents until 1632. From 1639 to 1641, Karl was Chief Captain of High and Low Silesia.

After the Thirty Years' War, Karl effectively restored his dominions economically. He was also an extensive patron of architecture of the period. He formed the early plans for Plumlov Castle, which in fact his son the future Hans-Adam I oversaw the construction of.

He died in Schwarzkosteletz in 1684.

== Marriage and issue ==
Karl married his niece, Princess Johanna Beatrix von Dietrichstein-Nikolsburg (c. 1625 – 26 March 1676) on 6 August 1644. They had nine children:

- Princess Eleonora Maria (1647 – 7 August 1704).
- Princess Anna Maria (1648–1654).
- Princess Maria Theresia (1649–1716).
- Princess Johanna Beatrix (1650–1672); Married Maximilian II, Prince of Liechtenstein (1641–1709).
- Prince Franz Dominik (died 1652).
- Prince Karl Joseph (died 1653).
- Prince Franz Eusebius (1654–1655).
- Princess Cecilia (died 1655).
- Prince Johann Adam Andreas (known as Hans-Adam I, Prince of Liechtenstein) (1662–1712).

== In popular culture ==
Karl Eusebius plays a prominent role in several of the works in the 1632 series of alternative history novels and stories.

Karl Eusebius, Prince of Liechtenstein House of Liechtenstein Born: 1611 Died: 1684
Regnal titles
Preceded by Karl I	Prince of Liechtenstein; 1627–1684	Succeeded by Hans-Adam I
