= Karl I of Liechtenstein =

Prince of Liechtenstein from 1608 to 1627

Karl I
- Duke of Troppau and Jägerndorf
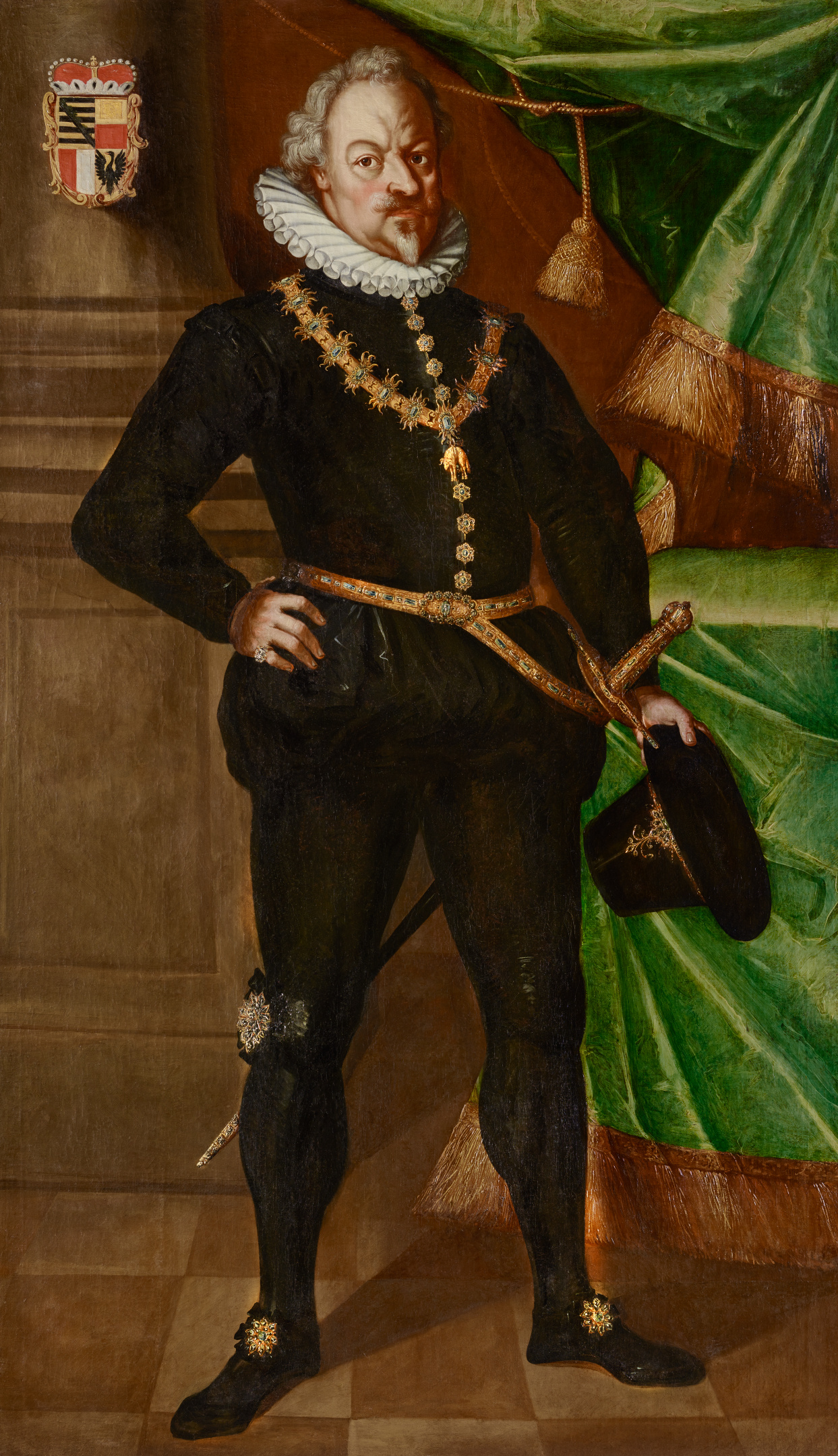
- Portrait, 1622–23

Prince of Liechtenstein
- Reign: 20 December 1608 – 12 February 1627
- Successor: Karl Eusebius
- Born: 30 July 1569
- Died: 12 February 1627 (aged 57); Prague, Kingdom of Bohemia, Holy Roman Empire
- Burial: Church of the Nativity of the Virgin Mary, Brno
- Spouse: Baroness Anna Maria Šemberová of Boskovice and Černá Hora (m. 1590; died 1625)
- Issue: Prince Heinrich; Princess Anna Maria; Princess Franziska Barbara; Karl Eusebius, Prince of Liechtenstein; Princess Anna Maria
- House: Liechtenstein (founder)
- Father: Baron Hartmann II of Liechtenstein
- Mother: Countess Anna Maria of Ortenburg
- Religion: Lutheran (1569–1599); Roman Catholic (1599-1627)

Karl I (30 July 1569 – 12 February 1627) was the first member of the House of Liechtenstein to become Prince of the Holy Roman Empire, but only as an honorary title, since the Liechtenstein family did not yet possess any territory with semi-sovereignty (Landeshoheit) within the Holy Roman Empire. (The territory of Liechtenstein was first purchased in 1699 and 1712 and declared a principality in 1719, whereby the princes became the monarchs of Liechtenstein.) Karl was the elder son of Hartmann II, Baron of Liechtenstein, and Countess Anna Maria of Ortenburg. Emperor Rudolf II of the Holy Roman Empire appointed Karl as chief intendant (Obersthofmeister), an important position at his court. Karl held this position until 1607. He became a Catholic in 1599.

In a dispute over land between Rudolf II and the heir presumptive to the throne, Archduke Matthias, Karl sided with Matthias. Liechtenstein played a leading role as adviser and supporter of Matthias in the coup against Emperor Rudolf II. Now-Hungarian King Matthias made him a hereditary prince in 1608, in thanks for Karl's aid. In his politics and assertiveness as advisor to Matthias, he rivaled Melchior Khlesl, Bishop of Vienna, who ultimately prevailed over Karl of Liechtenstein and became the new minister-favourite of King and later Emperor Matthias.

In 1614, Karl added the Duchy of Troppau to his possessions. In 1619, Matthias was succeeded by Emperor Ferdinand II, the arch-Catholic monarch who triggered the Thirty Years' War for religious reasons; Charles's reconversion now proved advantageous. In thanks for further aid at the Battle of White Mountain, Karl was appointed to the positions of proconsul and vice-regent of Bohemia in 1622, and he was bestowed with the Order of the Golden Fleece.

He gained the Duchy of Troppau on 28 December 1613 and the Silesian Duchy of Jägerndorf on 15 March 1622, along with much confiscated protestant "rebel property", and he commissioned the ducal hat of Liechtenstein.

In 1605, Karl established the first branch north of the Alps of the Hospitaller Order of Saint John of God at Feldsberg in Lower Austria (now Valtice, Czech Republic).

He was the 352nd Knight of the Order of the Golden Fleece in Austria. He died in Prague in 1627.

== Marriage and issue ==
In 1600, Karl married Anna Maria Šemberová, Baroness of and Černá Hora and Lady of Aussee. They had at least four children:

- Princess Anna Maria Franziska (7 December 1601 – 26 April 1640), married Maximilian, Prince of Dietrichstein (1596 – 1655).
- Princess Franziska Barbara (1604–1655), married Wenzel Werner of T'Serclaes, Count of Tilly (1599 – 1653).
- Prince Heinrich (died young).
- Karl Eusebius, Prince of Liechtenstein (11 April 1611 – 5 April 1684).

== Ancestry ==
Ancestors of Karl I of Liechtenstein

8. Baron Hartmann of Liechtenstein, Lord of Valtice
4. Baron Georg Hartmann of Liechtenstein, Lord of Valtice
9. Johanna, Lady of Mainburg
2. Baron Hartmann II of Liechtenstein, Lord of Valtice, Lednice and Steyregg
10. Baron Georg VI of Liechtenstein, Lord of Steyregg
5. Baroness Susanna of Liechtenstein
11. Baroness Magdalena of Polheim
1. Karl I, Prince of Liechtenstein
12. Ulrich II, Count of Ortenburg
6. Karl I, Count of Ortenburg
13. Baroness Veronika of Aichberg
3. Countess Anna Maria of Ortenburg
14. Leonhard II of Fraunberg, Count of Haag
7. Countess Maximiliana of Fraunberg-Haag
15. Landgravine Amalie of Leuchtenberg

Karl I of Liechtenstein House of Liechtenstein Born: 1569 Died: 12 February 1627
Regnal titles
New title	Prince of Liechtenstein; 1608–1627	Succeeded by Karl Eusebius
