= Prince Joseph Wenzel of Liechtenstein =

Liechtenstein prince (born 1995)

Prince Joseph Wenzel
- Count of Rietberg
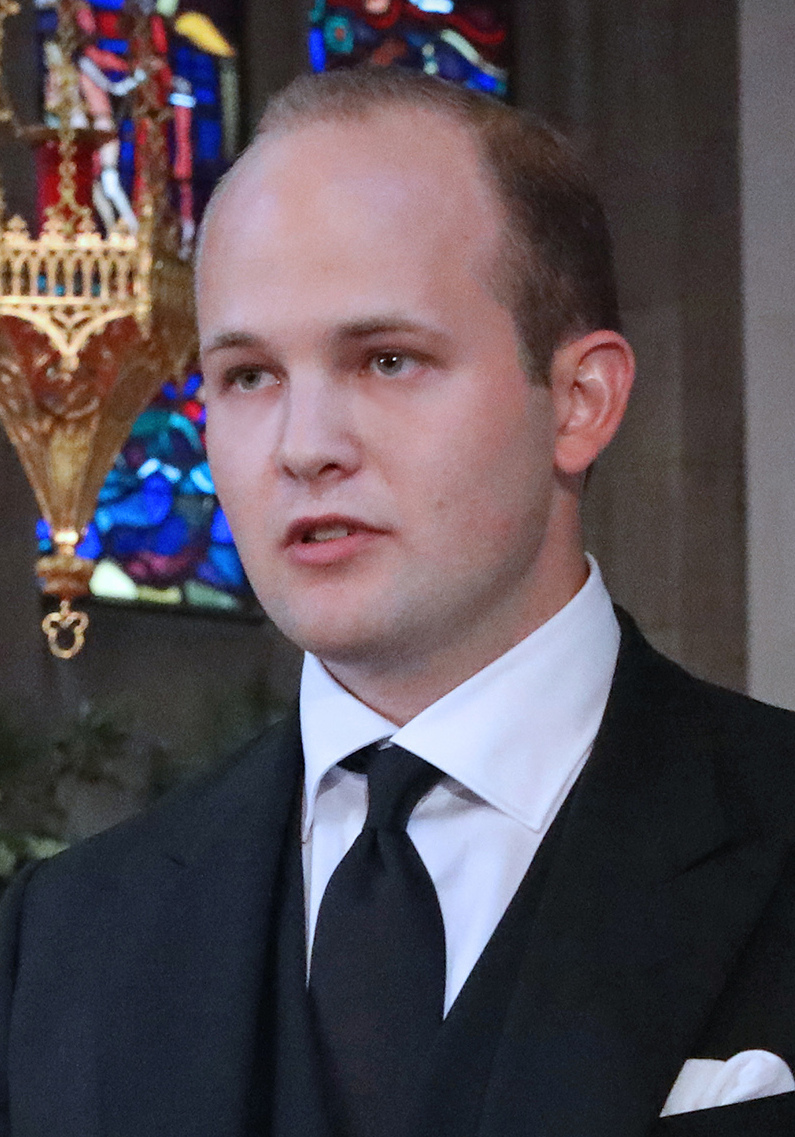
- Joseph Wenzel in 2021
- Born: 24 May 1995 (age 31); Portland Hospital, London, England
Names
- Joseph Wenzel Maximilian Maria Liechtenstein
- House: Liechtenstein
- Father: Alois, Hereditary Prince of Liechtenstein
- Mother: Duchess Sophie in Bavaria
- Religion: Roman Catholic

Prince Joseph Wenzel of Liechtenstein, Count of Rietberg (German: Joseph Wenzel Maximilian Maria von und zu Liechtenstein, Graf zu Rietberg, [ˈjoːzɛf ˈvɛnt͡sl̩]; born 24 May 1995) is the eldest child of Alois, Hereditary Prince of Liechtenstein, and his wife, Duchess Sophie Elizabeth Marie Gabrielle in Bavaria. He is also the eldest grandchild of the current ruling prince of Liechtenstein, Hans-Adam II, and Countess Marie Kinsky of Wchinitz and Tettau. He is second in the line of succession to the Liechtensteiner throne after his father.

== Biography ==
Prince Joseph Wenzel (Joseph Wenceslaus) was born on 24 May 1995 at the Portland Hospital in the West End of London to Hereditary Prince Alois and his wife Hereditary Princess Sophie (née Duchess Sophie in Bavaria). He has three younger siblings: Princess Marie Caroline, Prince Georg and Prince Nikolaus. The Prince is named Joseph Wenzel Maximilian Maria after Joseph Wenzel I, Prince of Liechtenstein, his maternal grandfather Prince Max, Duke in Bavaria, and his paternal uncle and godfather Prince Maximilian of Liechtenstein. He is informally known as Prince Wenzel.

Wenzel was educated at Malvern College, a coeducational boarding school in Worcestershire, England. He graduated from Malvern College in 2014. He spent a gap year pursuing an internship at the United States Senate and travelling to Peru and Bolivia.

== Dynastic ties ==
Since birth, Joseph Wenzel has held the titles "Prince of Liechtenstein" and "Count of Rietberg". He is second in line for the throne of Liechtenstein, preceded only by his father, who has been regent since 15 August 2004. However, Joseph Wenzel's grandfather Prince Hans-Adam II formally remains head of state and of the Princely House of Liechtenstein. Upon the accession of his father, Joseph Wenzel would become the hereditary prince (Erbprinz), i.e. the heir apparent to the throne.

Joseph Wenzel is also third in line in the Jacobite succession as successor to the current heir, his maternal grand-uncle Franz, Duke of Bavaria. If he becomes the Jacobite claimant, he would be the first to be born in Britain since "James III and VIII" (James Francis Edward Stuart, or the "Old Pretender") in 1688.

== References and notes ==
Prince Joseph Wenzel of Liechtenstein House of Liechtenstein Born: 24 May 1995
Lines of succession
Preceded by The Hereditary Prince	Line of succession to the Liechtensteiner throne 2nd position	Succeeded by Prince Georg
Preceded by The Hereditary Princess of Liechtenstein	— TITULAR — Jacobite succession 3rd position	Succeeded by Prince Georg
