= Franz von Bayern =

Head of the House of Wittelsbach since 1996

- Franz in 2023

Head of the House of Wittelsbach
- Tenure: 8 July 1996 – present
- Predecessor: Albrecht
- Heir presumptive: Max Emanuel
- Born: Franz Bonaventura Adalbert Maria Prinz von Bayern; 14 July 1933 (age 93); Munich, Germany
- House: Wittelsbach
- Father: Albrecht, Duke of Bavaria
- Mother: Countess Maria Draskovich of Trakostjan
- Religion: Catholicism

Franz Bonaventura Adalbert Maria Herzog von Bayern (born 14 July 1933), commonly known by the courtesy title Duke of Bavaria, is the head of the House of Wittelsbach, the former ruling family of the Kingdom of Bavaria. His great-grandfather King Ludwig III was the last ruling monarch of Bavaria, being deposed in 1918.

Franz was born in Munich. During the Second World War, the Wittelsbachs were anti-Nazi. The family initially left Nazi Germany for the Kingdom of Hungary but were eventually arrested following Operation Panzerfaust in 1944. Franz, who was only 11 at the time, spent time in several Nazi concentration camps, including Sachsenhausen, then Flossenbürg and finally Dachau.

After the war, Franz was a student at LMU Munich and became a collector of modern art. Franz succeeded as head of the House of Wittelsbach, and as pretender to the defunct Bavarian throne, on the death of his father in 1996. He lives at Nymphenburg Palace in Munich and Berg Palace.

In the Jacobite succession, Franz is heir to the thrones of England, Scotland, and Ireland, which he does not pursue.

== Birth, exile, captivity, and education ==
Franz was born on 14 July 1933 in Munich, as the third child and elder son of Albrecht, Duke of Bavaria, and his first wife, Countess Maria (Marita) Draskovich of Trakostjan, member of the House of Drašković, an old Croatian noble family. As Maria's family did not belong to the small circle of reigning or former reigning families, his parents' marriage was initially considered morganatic. But, on 18 May 1949, when Franz was 15, his grandfather Crown Prince Rupprecht recognised the marriage of Franz's parents as dynastic, and Franz became a successor to the headship of the house.

The Wittelsbach dynasty were opposed to the Nazi regime in Germany. The former Crown Prince Rupprecht earned Hitler's enmity by opposing the Beer Hall Putsch in 1923. In 1933, shortly after Adolf Hitler's rise to power, he sent his son Albrecht to President Paul von Hindenburg with a protest letter strongly objecting to the appointment of governors at the head of the federal states and thus the de facto abolition of German federalism. In July 1934, Prince Albrecht emigrated to Hungary with his family. From 1935 to 1939 the family returned to Bavaria and lived in seclusion in Kreuth, but former crown prince Rupprecht emigrated to Italy in 1939 and his son Albrecht and his family moved back to Budapest, where they stayed in a rented apartment in the Castle Quarter. They often visited Princess Marita's Hungarian and Croatian relatives in the countryside. The children received private lessons after a visit to the German school failed after a few weeks because it was dominated by Nazi supporters.

In March 1944, Nazi Germany occupied Hungary, and on 6 October 1944 the entire family, including the 11-year-old Franz, were arrested by the Gestapo. They were sent to a series of Nazi concentration camps, including Oranienburg, Flossenbürg and Dachau. As special prisoners, they were allowed to stay together and were locked in separate buildings. Franz remembers that they only received one slice of bread, often moldy, per person per day as food. Badly hit by hunger and disease, the family barely survived. At the end of April 1945, they were liberated by the United States Third Army.

After the war, Franz received his secondary education at the Benedictine Abbey of Ettal. He then studied business management at LMU Munich and the University of Zurich. With his father and a sister, he took part in the ship tours organized by King Paul of Greece and Queen Frederica in 1954 and 1956, which became known as the "Cruise of the Kings" and were attended by over 100 royals from all over Europe.

== Patron of modern art ==
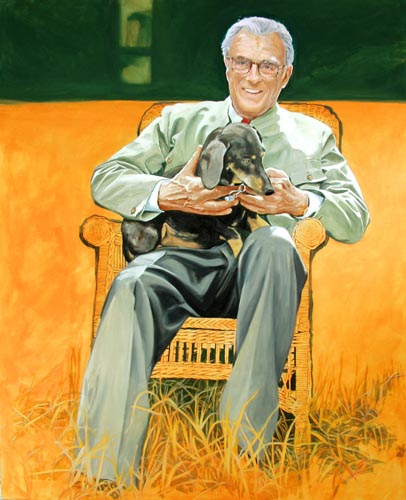
Duke Franz, painted by Dieter Stein in 1985

Franz developed a passion for modern art and started to collect contemporary German art. He brought his own important art collection with early works by Joseph Beuys, Georg Baselitz and Blinky Palermo as well as numerous contemporary German painters such as Jörg Immendorff and Sigmar Polke on permanent loan to the Pinakothek der Moderne in Munich, which he had worked to found for decades, as well as to the Munich State Graphic Collection. He is chairman of the Association for the Promotion of the Alte Pinakothek, co-founder and deputy chairman of the Munich Gallery Association, member of the board of trustees of the Association of Friends and Supporters of the Glyptothek and the Bavarian state collections of antiquities and honorary president of the Friends of the Egyptian Collection Munich. In 2009, he left his extensive private library of 20th and 21st century art to the Central Institute for Art History in Munich.

Because of his good connections in the New York City art scene, his understanding of art, his international connections as well as his fate during the Nazi era, Franz von Bayern was the first German to be elected to the International Council of the Museum of Modern Art, where numerous Jewish emigrants set the tone. Only after him were other Germans elected to the advisory committee. He eventually became chairman of the International Council for 16 years and worked closely with the museum's president, Blanchette Rockefeller, in expanding the collection in the 1980s. Despite his friendship with American artists such as Jasper Johns, Robert Rauschenberg, Andy Warhol and Dan Flavin, he privately collected mostly contemporary German art: "American art was always one step ahead of my financial possibilities."

In 2003, for his decades of support work, he was the first European to receive the Duncan Phillips Award from the Washington art museum Phillips Collection, which has been awarded to collectors and donors who support museums since 1999.

== Further activities ==
The respective head of the House of Wittelsbach appoints the board of directors of the foundation Wittelsbach Compensation Fund, into which most of the possessions from the former Wittelsbach House Property Fund were transferred in 1923, including art treasures and collections (in particular the art collection of King Ludwig I, today mostly in the museums Alte Pinakothek and Neue Pinakothek and in the Glyptothek in Munich), the Secret House Archives (today a department of the Bavarian State Archives) and the former royal palaces of Berg, Hohenschwangau (including the Museum of the Bavarian Kings), Berchtesgaden as well as Grünau hunting lodge. He also appoints one of the board members of the Wittelsbach State Foundation for Art and Science, into which the Wittelsbach art treasures acquired before 1800 were brought in in 1923. Since then, this foundation has owned a large part of the holdings of the Munich museums. The former Bavarian Royal Family receives around 14 million Euros in payments annually from the proceeds of the Wittelsbach Compensation Fund. The respective head of the family decides on their distribution and use.

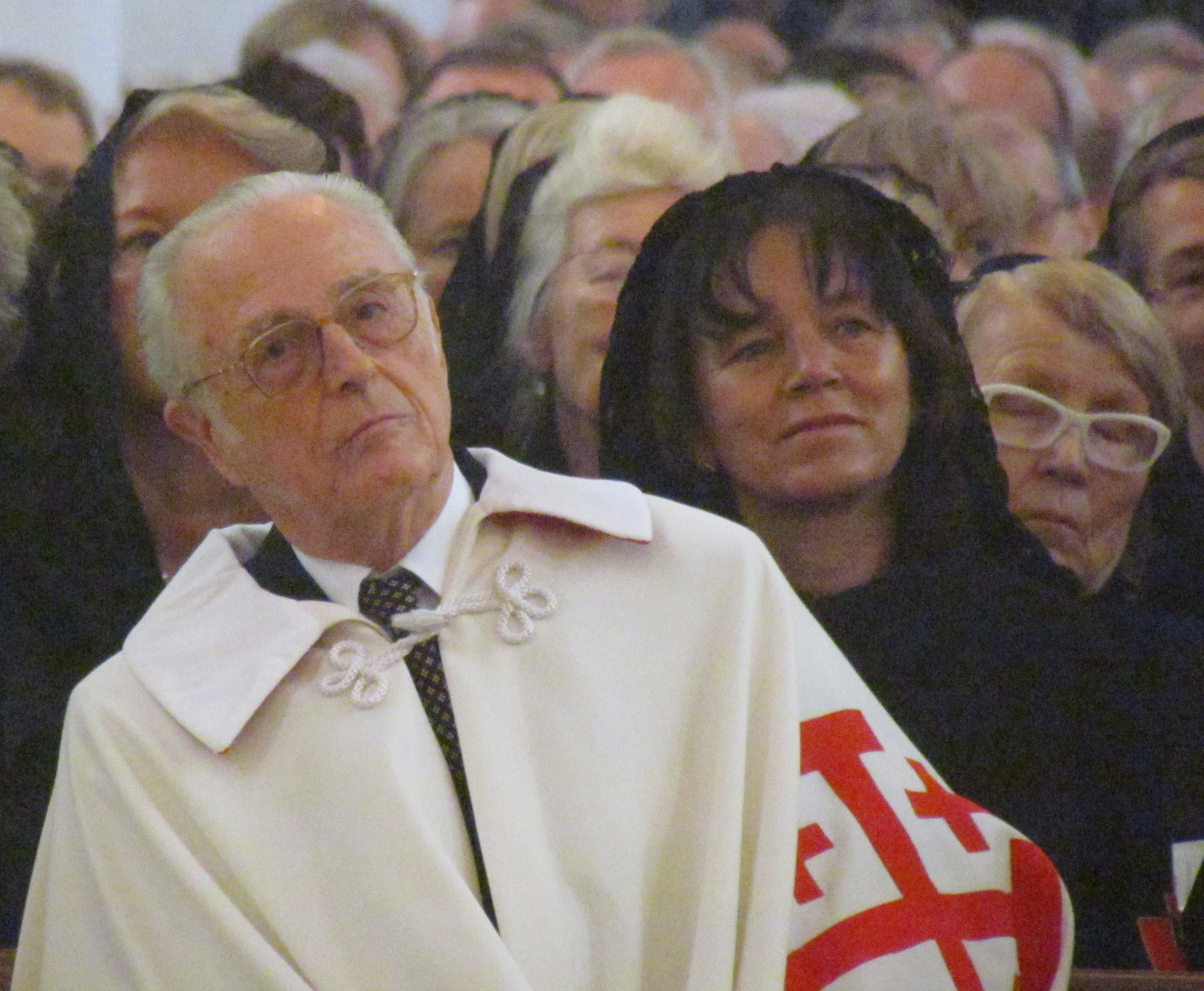
Franz von Bayern in the regalia of the Order of the Holy Sepulchre (Munich, 2012)

As head of the House of Wittelsbach, Franz is also Grand Master of the Wittelsbach House Orders, the Order of Saint George, the Order of St. Hubert and the Order of Theresa. Furthermore, he is president of the Bavarian Order Provinces of the Knights' Order of the Holy Sepulchre of Jerusalem and of the Sovereign Military Order of Malta.

In addition to modern art and contemporary music, Franz' interest lies in the sciences, where he supported the development and expansion of the Bavarian research landscape. He was a member of the board of trustees of LMU Munich, the Technical University of Munich, the Munich School of Philosophy, the Deutsches Museum and the Institute for Bavarian History. As a patron, he heads numerous other organizations, such as the Bavarian Sports Shooting Association.

There is traditionally a close connection between the House of Wittelsbach and the Roman Catholic Church, especially with the respective Archbishop of Munich, but also with various orders such as the Benedictines and Franciscans. Franz worked voluntarily for many years in the management of the Catholic Academy in Bavaria. He expanded its relationships through contacts with the Evangelical Lutheran Church in Bavaria and the Jewish communities in Bavaria. In 2007 he institutionalized this network as co-founder of the Nymphenburg Talks, a platform for intercultural and interfaith dialogue that also includes Muslim representatives.

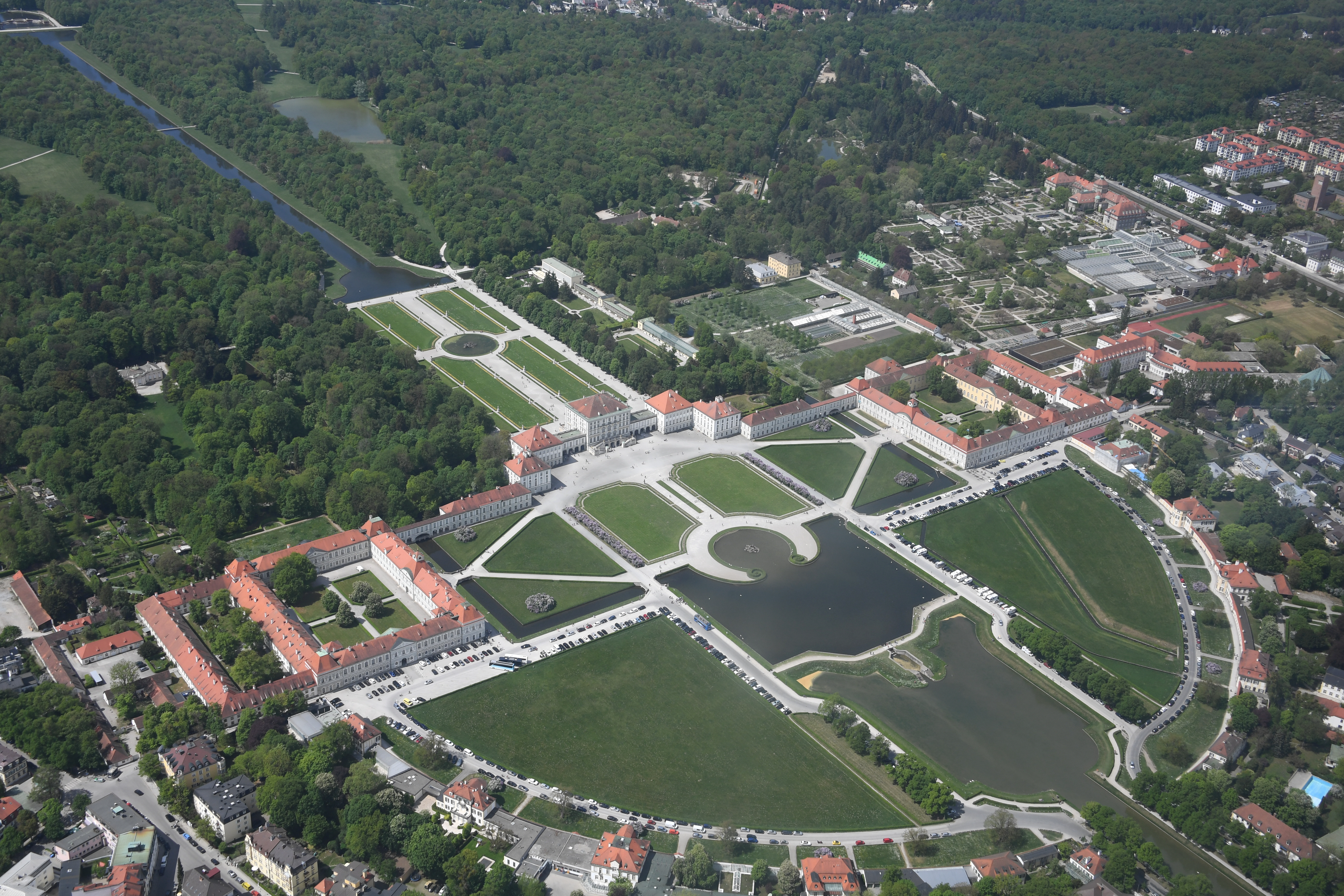
Nymphenburg Palace

Franz maintained the tradition founded by his father of holding a large annual reception with a sit-down dinner at Nymphenburg Palace where he lives in a side-wing (the second pavilion to the right of the central pavilion is his residence, including a private garden within the palace park). Around 1,500 mostly changing guests from state politics, municipalities, churches and sciences, art and medicine as well as friends and relatives are invited. He also invites smaller groups of changing guests to Berchtesgaden Palace to discuss specific topics that are important to him.

His 80th birthday party, in 2013, was held at the Schleissheim Palace near Munich. The party was attended by 2,500 guests, including the then-incumbent Minister-President of Bavaria, Horst Seehofer.

== Personal life and succession ==
Franz has had a life partner since 1980, Thomas Greinwald, although they have never married. In August 2011, the duke appeared at Prince George Frederick of Prussia's wedding, accompanied by Greinwald and his first cousin once removed – and future heir – Prince Ludwig. He and Greinwald first appeared publicly as a couple in Munich in 2023. The heir presumptive to the headship of the House of Wittelsbach is his brother Max Emanuel Herzog in Bayern. Because Max has five daughters but no sons, he is followed in the Bavarian line of succession by his and Franz's first cousin (second cousin in the male line) Prince Luitpold, and in the next generation by the latter's son Ludwig (born 1982).

Franz is a descendant of the House of Stuart. Were it not for the Act of Settlement 1701, Franz would be the successor to the English, Scottish, and Irish crowns of the Stuart kings. Franz's spokesman has, however, made it clear that this is a purely "hypothetical issue", "an entirely British question which does not concern him" and not a claim that he pursues. In his memoirs, Franz describes this claim to the British throne as a "charming historical curiosity", which he had first heard about on a trip to Scotland, to which his parents, who had never mentioned it, had sent him during his later school years. In the Royal Stuart Society, a toast was raised to the ″King over the Water″ in honor of his father, just as the Jacobites once did. Franz recounts: Charles, then Prince of Wales, "was often in Munich, and we were often teased about it. He responded with great wit." When Charles visited Franz at Nymphenburg Palace in 1987, reporters asked him about Franz's claim to the British throne. He jokingly replied that this claim was probably better than his own.

While Franz's brother Max Emanuel is the heir presumptive of both the Bavarian and Jacobite claims to a royal throne, the two lines of succession will diverge after him. This is because, according to Salic law, the Bavarian claims to the throne are inherited exclusively through the male line, whereas under British succession law, the Jacobite claim also passes to female descendants. This means that, after Max Emanuel, his eldest daughter Sophie, Hereditary Princess of Liechtenstein, would be the heir to this claim, followed by her eldest son, Prince Joseph Wenzel of Liechtenstein, who is second in line to the Liechtenstein throne after his father. He would not be the first Jacobite pretender to reign in another country, but the first, since the Old Pretender in 1688, to be born on British soil (1995 in London).

== Titles, styles and honours ==
=== Titles and styles ===
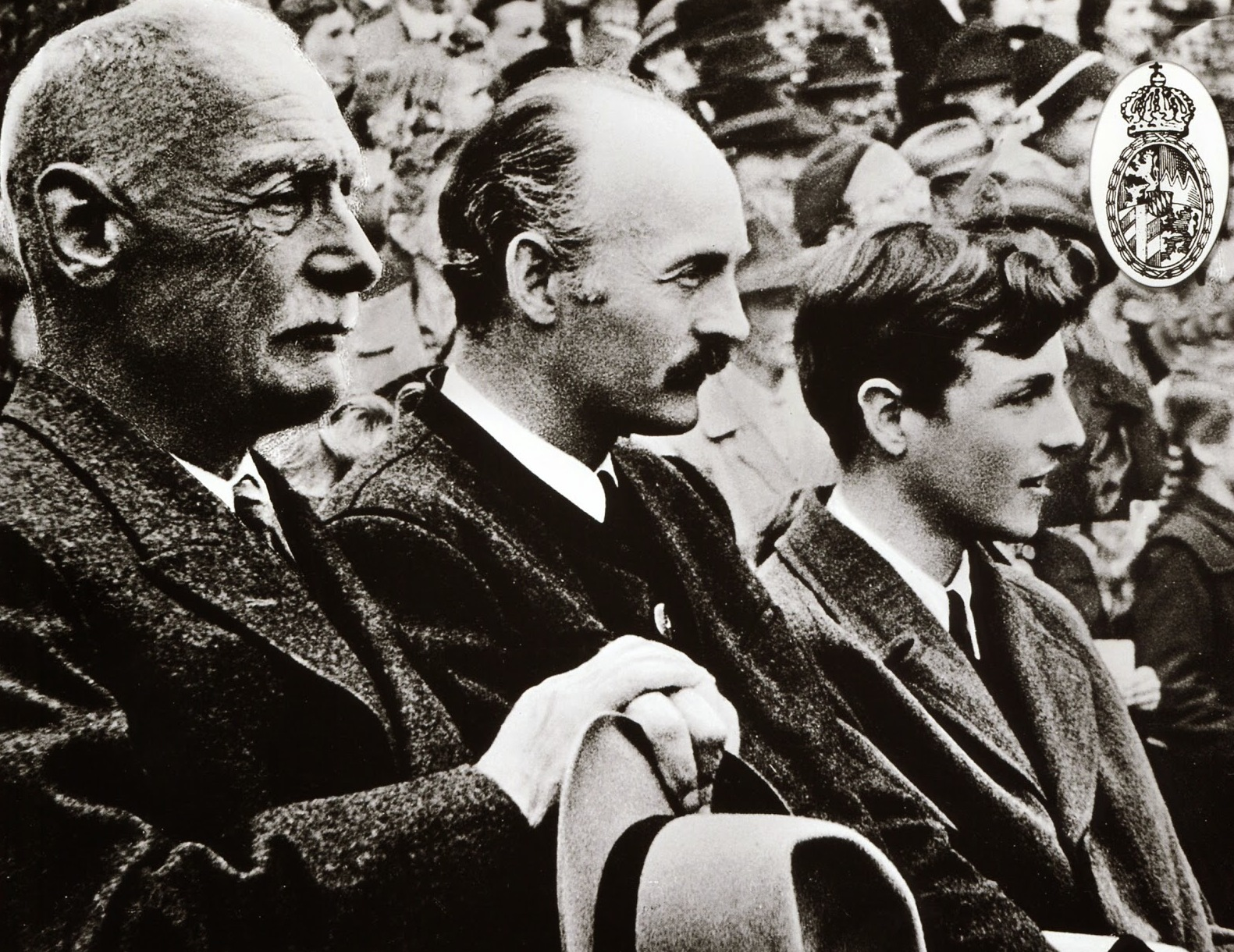
Prince Franz (right) with his father Duke Albrecht (centre) and his grandfather Rupprecht, Crown Prince of Bavaria, in 1948.

Franz is traditionally styled as His Royal Highness the Duke of Bavaria, of Franconia and in Swabia, Count Palatine of the Rhine. The four traditional titles were held as secondary titles by the kings in the Kingdom of Bavaria.

Franz was styled Prinz von Bayern at birth. In 1996, after the death of his father, he changed his style to Herzog von Bayern ('Duke of Bavaria').

The title Duke of Bavaria is by far the oldest German rank. Around 548, Garibald I received the ducal title for Bavaria from the Frankish king Theudebald of Austrasia, shortly after the settlement or ethnogenesis of the Baiuvarii in what then became the tribal Duchy of Bavaria. Over 600 years later, in 1180, the feud and title were bestowed by Emperor Frederick Barbarossa upon Otto of Wittelsbach and his descendants. Since then, the family name has been not von Wittelsbach, but von Bayern. Since that time, the ducal title has been borne by all members of the family, as the enfeoffment of the Duchy by the Emperor to the House of Wittelsbach was granted as a joint holding within the Holy Roman Empire, whereby the distribution of governmental power − throughout the entire country or within parts thereof − was left to the family. It was not until the era of the Kingdom of Bavaria that the agnates received the title of Prince. After the German revolution of 1918–1919, the last Crown Prince retained his title, and his son subsequently resumed the ducal title as head of the family.

=== Honours ===
==== National dynastic honours ====
- (Kingdom of Bavaria) House of Wittelsbach: Sovereign Knight of the Royal Order of Saint Hubert
- (Kingdom of Bavaria) House of Wittelsbach: Sovereign Knight Grand Commander of the Royal Order of Saint George
- (Kingdom of Bavaria) House of Wittelsbach: Sovereign Knight Grand Cross of the Royal Order of Saint Michael
- House of Saxe-Coburg and Gotha: Knight Grand Cross of the Order of Saxe-Coburg and Gotha

==== National honour ====
- Germany: Commander of the Order of Merit of the Federal Republic of Germany

==== Foreign honours ====
- (Austrian Empire) Austrian Imperial and Royal Family: Knight of the Order of the Golden Fleece, 1960
- (Vatican City) Latin Catholic Patriarchate of Jerusalem: Knight Grand Cross with Collar of the Order of the Holy Sepulchre
- Romania: Knight Grand Cross of the Order of National Merit
- Sovereign Military Order of Malta: Protector Bailiff Knight Grand Cross of Honour and Devotion of the Order of Saint John
- Sovereign Military Order of Malta: Knight Grand Cross of the Order of Merit
- Vatican: Knight Grand Cross of the Order of St. Gregory the Great

== See also ==
- Monarchism in Bavaria after 1918

== Bibliography ==
- Adalbert, Prinz von Bayern. Die Wittelsbacher: Geschichte unserer Familie. München: Prestel, 1979.

Franz von Bayern House of Wittelsbach Born: 14 July 1933
Titles in pretence
Preceded by Albrecht, Duke of Bavaria	— TITULAR — King of Bavaria; 8 July 1996 – present Reason for succession failure: Kingdom abolished in 1918	Incumbent; Heir presumptive: Prince Max, Duke in Bavaria
Preceded by Albrecht, Duke of Bavaria	— TITULAR — King of England, Scotland and Ireland; 8 July 1996 – present Reason for succession failure: Act of Settlement	Incumbent; Heir presumptive: Prince Max, Duke in Bavaria
