= Greek crown jewels =

The crown jewels of the Kingdom of Greece are a set of symbolic regalia (crown, sceptre, and orb) that were created for King Otto shortly after his election to the throne in 1832.

== History ==
After his election to the throne of Greece in 1832, Otto ordered a crown, orb, sceptre and sword from Fossin et Fils Goldsmiths in Paris; the sword, however, was made by Jules Manceaux. The regalia arrived in Greece in 1835 and was modelled on the regalia of Bavaria but they did not have any precious stones (especially the crown) and thus they resemble funerary European regalia. They were made of precious metals, mainly gold and perhaps partly silver. He established them as the royal regalia of the Crown of Greece but they were not used for a coronation as Otto was never crowned. In 1862, a coup overthrew Otto and the King was forced into exile. As he left returning to Bavaria, Otto took with him the regalia. With his death, they were bequeathed to Prince Luitpold, Otto's successor and pretender to the Greek throne.

Almost a century later, in December 1959, Albrecht, Duke of Bavaria, head of the House of Wittelsbach and descendant of Prince Luitpold, sent his son Maximilian-Emmanuel to Athens in order to formally recognize the rights to the throne of the House of Oldenburg. The Prince then handed over all the regalia that Otto had taken with him into exile to King Paul of Greece.

In 2023, they were located in Tatoi Palace by employes of the Ministry of Culture and are to be exhibited in the Old Royal Palace's trophy hall.

== Objects ==
=== Crown ===
Crown of Greece

Details
- Country: Kingdom of Greece
- Material: Gold
