= Royal Order of Saint George for the Defense of the Immaculate Conception =

Bavarian order of chivalry

Royal Military Order of Saint George for the Defense of the Faith and the Immaculate Conception
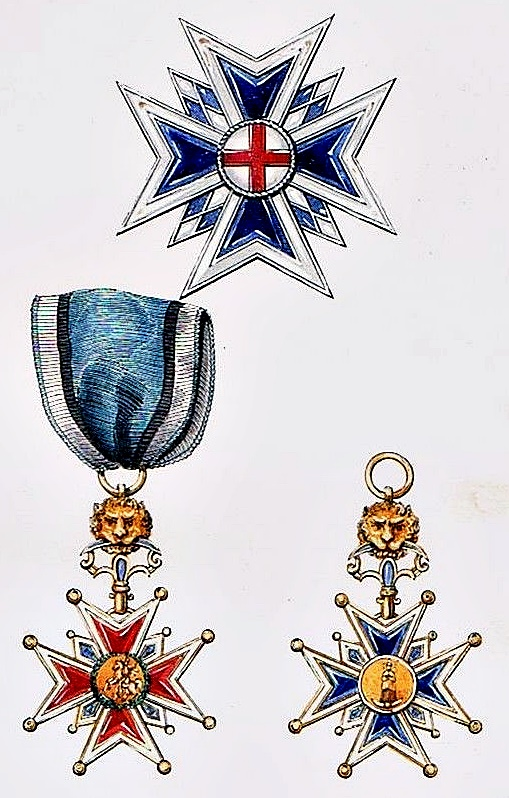

Awarded by The Head of the House of Wittelsbach
- Type: Dynastic order
- Established: 1728/1729
- Country: (Kingdom of Bavaria) Bavaria
- Royal house: House of Wittelsbach
- Motto: IN FIDE JUSTITIA ET FORTITUDINE
- Founder: Maximilian II Emanuel
- Sovereign: Franz, Duke of Bavaria
- Grand Master: Prince Max
- Grades: Grand Prior; Knight Grand Commander; Knight Commander; Knight

Precedence
- Next (higher): Order of Saint Hubert
- Next (lower): Military Order of Max Joseph
- Equivalent: Order of Saint Elizabeth

The Royal Military Order of Saint George for the Defense of the Faith and the Immaculate Conception (German: Königlicher Militärorden des Heiligen Georg zur Verteidigung des Glaubens und der Unbefleckten Empfängnis), also known as the Royal Bavarian House Equestrian Order of Saint George (German: Königlich Bayerischer Haus-Ritter-Orden vom Heiligen Georg), was founded by Maximilian II Emanuel, Elector of Bavaria in 1729 to provide for a means of honouring the nobility and recognizing distinguished civil and military service.

== Establishment ==
There are rumors that the order was founded as early as the twelfth century, or by Emperor Maximilian I a reference to the Habsburg Order of Saint George. Allegedly, the tradition of loyalty to the patron saint of chivalry, Saint George, was long established in Germany, and various Bavarian Princes, most notably Eckhard I, Count of Scheyern, who until the fifteenth century had made pilgrimages to the Holy Sepulcher and were there invested as knights, had each made a promise to Saint George.

The Order was founded by Elector Charles Albert on April 24, 1729, who gave it its title of Order of the Holy Knight and Martyr Saint George and the Immaculate Conception of the Holy Virgin Mary and established its statutes on March 28, 1729, as a Military Order of Chivalry for Roman Catholic noblemen The Grand Master always was the elector, later the king of Bavaria.

Its foundation as a Catholic Order was confirmed in the papal bull nihil aeque jucundum of 15 March 1728 specifically giving the Order the same rights as the Teutonic Order.

It was originally divided in the German and the Foreign class or tongue, the latter including every member with non-German ancestors. By a reform of 1741, a clerical class was introduced, also limited to noblemen, including a bishop, provosts, four deans, and chaplains.

The order was divided in four classes:

1. Three Grand Priors
2. Six Knights Grand Commander
3. Twelve Knights Commander
4. Knights

The Order was organised in three Grand Priories: Upper Bavaria, Lower Bavaria and Upper Palatinate. The rank of the Grand Prior was limited to the princes of Bavaria. Knights were promoted to Commanders and Commanders to Grand Commander alternating by the Grand Master (de grâce) and by seniority (de justice).

The statutes in forty articles dedicate the members to an ardent Christian devotion unparalleled among institutions founded in the eighteenth century, the age of the Enlightenment. They require that the knights "must honour God above all else; You must be strong in faith in Our Lord Jesus Christ, honor your Sovereign Lord, love and respect him and his royal prerogatives" and replicate promises made at the Tomb.

Due its statutes, the order was originally a dynastic (elector, later king as Grand Master, princes as Grand Priors), a religious (defense of the Immaculate Conception), and an order of merit (promotion of every second Grand Commander and Commander by the Grand Master; limitation of different grades) at the same time.

== Order in 19th and 20th centuries ==
In reforming the various military and noble Orders, Maximilian I. confirmed the privileges already enjoyed by the knights of Saint George, giving them precedence after the knights of Saint Hubert. By a new Constitution of 25 February 1827, Maximilian's son and successor, Ludwig I declared that the King was always to be Grand Master, the Crown Prince the first Grand Prior, and other Princes of the Bavarian Royal House second Grand Priors. These statutes, which have remained largely in force, established six Grand Commanders, twelve hereditary Commanders, and unlimited knights.

The requirements have always been formidable, as originally a member had to prove 32 quarters of nobility with 32 noble ancestors. Since the 1871 reforms, the requirement has been revised to proof of three hundred years of nobility in each of the four quarters and proof that all 32 great-great-great-grandparents were noble, still rigidly enforced. The statutes were again revised on 11 December 1999 (approved by the present Head of the House, Duke Franz, on 11 January 2000), suppressing the separate clerical class (priests may join the Order as regular members, provided they have the necessary nobiliary qualifications) and simplified the regulations. A candidate must be at least 21 years of age, and before admission, is examined by a committee of knights. The last King of Bavaria continued to maintain the Order after abdicating his throne and was succeeded by his son, Rupprecht, Crown Prince of Bavaria.

The present Grand Master of the Order is Franz Herzog von Bayern who succeeded his father, Duke Albrecht in 1996. Unlike other noble Orders, the rules requiring noble proofs are strictly enforced and there is no category of "honorary" or "grace" knights. The Order is dedicated to the practice of works of charity and the establishment of hospitals, and until recently maintained a 100-bed hospital. There are about ninety members and the Order celebrates its feast days on Saint George's Day (24 April) and the Feast of the Immaculate Conception (8 December). The coadjutor Grand Master and first Grand Prior is Prince Max, Duke in Bavaria, and the Princes Luitpold, Wolfgang, Christoph and Leopold of Bavaria are Grand Priors (2013).

== Insignia ==
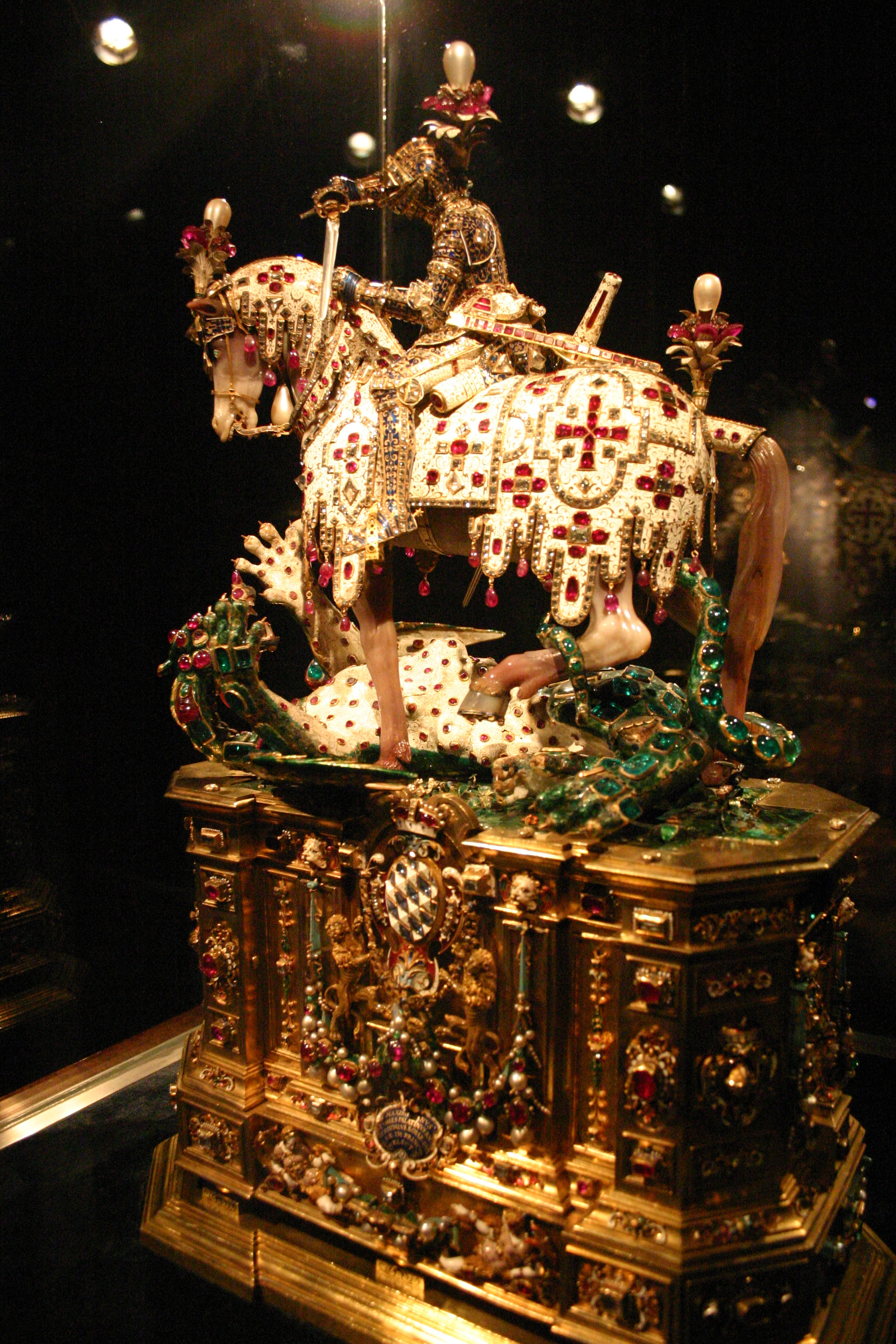
A Renaissance reliquary of St. George in the Treasury of the Munich Residenz is prominently displayed on the high altar of the Royal Chapel during ceremonies of the order.

The badge of the Order is a blue enamelled gold Maltese cross with white enamelled borders with small gold balls on the points and blue diagonal lozenges between the arms also with white enamelled borders. Each of these lozenges bears a gold letter, V. I. B. I., representing the words Virgini Immaculatae Bavaria Immaculata ("Immaculate Bavaria for the Immaculate Virgin"). The round gold medallion in the center has the image of the Virgin Mary within a white enamelled border. The reverse of the badge has the same design except that the arms of the cross are enamelled red, the blue lozenges bear the letters I. V. P. F., representing the words Justis Vt Palma Fiorebit ("Distinguished for Justice and Glory") and the center gold medallion is of Saint George slaying the Dragon within a green enamelled laurel wreath. The badge hangs from a light blue silk moire ribbon with white stripes near its border with narrow dark blue stripes on the inside of these white stripes by means of a suspension link in the form of a gold lion's head holding in its mouth a blue reverse crescent shaped handle of the gold and enamel strapwork supporting the badge proper. The officials of the order wore a special heraldic cross, a Maltese cross like the former, but with its round central medallion bearing the red cross of St. George on a white background and on its upper and lower arms a gold lion rampart on black background (i.e., the arms of the Electorate of the Palatinate) and on the right and left arms three blue lozenges on a white background (i.e., the arms of the Duchy of Bavaria). Between the arms of the cross are lozenges bearing the letters I. V. I. B. on a blue background, but without the white enameled borders. This cross hangs from the same gold lion's head suspension cross as the badge of the order.

The star is a Maltese cross like the badge but in silver instead of gold, the arms being also blue with white borders, but with four blue and white alternating lozenges between each of the arms and with the red cross of Saint George on a white background as its centre medallion.

On formal occasions the badge is worn by the members of the first class of the order (i.e., Grand Master, Grand Priors and Grand Commanders) from a gold collar formed of links in 1. the form of a gold rectangle, each bearing two or three letters of the motto of the order, IN FIDE JUSTITIA ET FORTITUDINE ("In faith, justice and fortitude"), with gold Bavarian royal crowns on the either side of this rectangle, between red enameled flames emitting from blue enameled strapwork on both the upper and lower sides of this link, alternating with links in 2. the form of two gold lions rampart combatant standing on a gold scroll, each supporting with one forepaw a central white enameled column surmounted by a gold orb and cross, the lion on the left holding a torch in its right forepaw and the lion on the right holding a sword in its left forepaw. Separating these alternating links and alternating with each of them are links 3. in the form of two lozenges, one above the other, with each lozenge subdivided into four blue and white lozenges (from the arms of Bavaria); i.e., 1-3-2-3-1-3, etc.

== The Formal Habit of the First Class ==
In the ceremonies of the first class of the order used to wear a formal habit consisting of a white satin tunic embroidered down the front and around the bottom hem in silver thread with a design of conjoined pairs of oak and olive wreaths, alternating with olive branches, with similar embroidery on the sleeves and the star of the order embroidered on the left breast. Over this was worn a steel blue velvet mantle with the same design of conjoined wreaths and olive branches embroidered in silver thread on the hem and collar of the mantle as on the tunic and the star of the order embroidered on the left breast, over which they wore the collar of the order. At present, the first class wear the collar of the order over a steel blue velvet calf length mantle without any embroidery except for the star of the order on the left breast on such occasions.

== Literature ==
- Statutes of the Royal Order of Saint George 1871 (Online)
