= Albrecht, Duke of Bavaria =

Bavarian prince (1905–1996)

Albrecht
- Duke of Bavaria
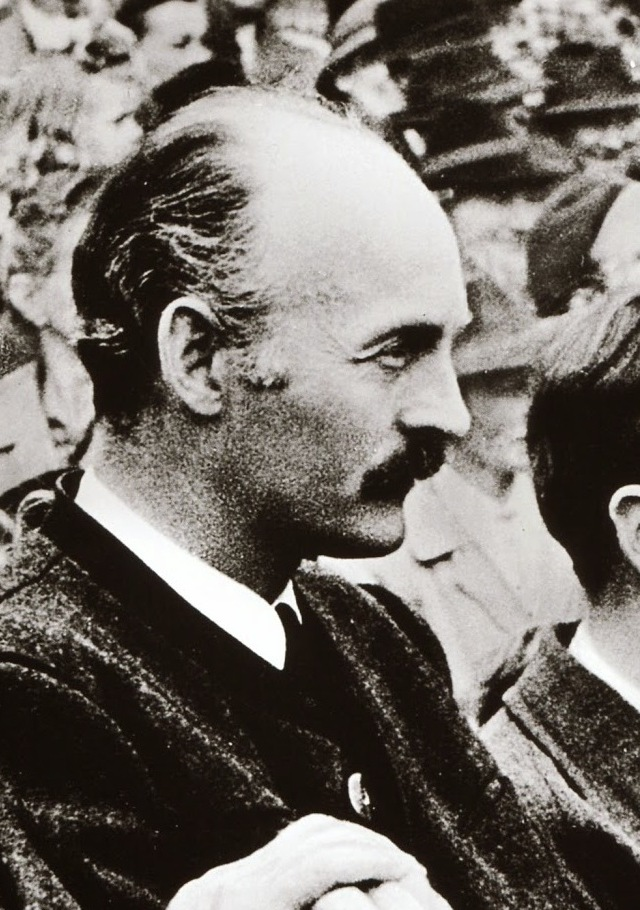
- Albrecht in 1948

Head of the House of Wittelsbach
- Tenure: 2 August 1955 – 8 July 1996
- Predecessor: Rupprecht
- Successor: Franz
- Born: 3 May 1905; Munich, Kingdom of Bavaria, German Empire
- Died: 8 July 1996 (aged 91); Berg Castle, Starnberg, Bavaria, Germany
- Burial: Wittelsbach cemetery, Andechs Abbey, Bavaria
- Spouse: Countess Maria Draskovich of Trakostjan (m. 1930; died 1969) Countess Marie-Jenke Keglevich of Buzin (m. 1971; died 1983)
- Issue: Marie Gabrielle, Princess von Waldburg zu Zeil und Trauchburg; Marie Charlotte, Princess von Quadt zu Wykradt und Isny; Franz von Bayern; Max Emanuel Herzog in Bayern
Names
- Albrecht Luitpold Ferdinand Michael
- House: Wittelsbach
- Father: Rupprecht, Crown Prince of Bavaria
- Mother: Duchess Marie Gabrielle in Bavaria

Albrecht, Duke of Bavaria (Albrecht Luitpold Ferdinand Michael; 3 May 1905 – 8 July 1996) was the son of the last crown prince of Bavaria, Rupprecht, and his first wife, Duchess Marie Gabrielle in Bavaria. He was the only child from that marriage who reached adulthood. His paternal grandfather was Ludwig III of Bavaria, the last king of Bavaria, who was deposed in 1918.

== Life ==
Albrecht with his younger half-brother, Prince Heinrich, in 1922.

Following the First World War, Albrecht's grandfather King Ludwig was deposed. Albrecht and the family temporarily moved from Bavaria to the Austrian Tyrol.

His family, the House of Wittelsbach, were opposed to the regime of Nazi Germany and refused to join the Nazi Party. His father, the former Crown Prince Rupprecht, earned Hitler's enmity by opposing the Beer Hall Putsch in 1923. In 1933, shortly after Adolf Hitler's rise to power, he sent his son Albrecht to President Paul von Hindenburg with a protest letter strongly objecting to the appointment of governors at the head of the federal states and thus the de facto abolition of German federalism. This public opposition meant that Prince Albrecht, who had studied forestry, was prevented from completing his studies. In July 1934, Albrecht emigrated to Hungary with his family. From 1935 to 1939 the family returned to Bavaria and lived in seclusion in Kreuth, but his father emigrated to Italy in 1939 and Albrecht and his family moved back to Budapest, where they stayed in a rented apartment in the Castle Quarter. They often visited his wife's Hungarian and Croatian relatives in the countryside, as well as Albrecht's uncle Prince Franz of Bavaria at his Nádasdy Castle in Sárvár. The children received private lessons. Albrecht took over the management of court hunting for the Prince Regent Paul of Yugoslavia until 1941.

In September 1943, the German Army occupied Italy and the former crown prince went into hiding in Florence. In October 1944, after Germany had occupied Hungary in March, Albrecht and his family were arrested by the Gestapo in the Erdődy mansion in Doba, Hungary, and deported to the Sachsenhausen concentration camp. Together with his wife, his four children and three of his half-sisters, they were held captive as “special prisoners” and then transported to the Flossenbürg and Dachau concentration camps. Albrecht almost died of dysentery. Badly hit by hunger and disease, the family barely survived. His son Franz writes in his memoirs that they only received one slice of bread, often moldy, per person per day as food. Despite the dramatic situation, according to him, his parents behaved “completely confidently from the start”. “My father used his aggressiveness as his only weapon and attacked anyone who came too close to him.”

Towards the end of the war, they were interned with other special prisoners, including the family of General Paulus, in a former hotel on Lake Plansee (Tyrol), but had to remain there under military guard even after they were liberated by the United States Third Army. After a while, Albrecht and his family fled to Linderhof and hid there with a forest ranger. Finally, together with numerous refugees from Hungary, they moved into an outbuilding of Leutstetten Castle near Starnberg, which was occupied by an Allied commission, where after some time the former crown prince also returned from Rome.

Since 1949 Albrecht lived at Berg Palace (Bavaria), 20 kilometres (12 mi) southwest of Munich on Lake Starnberg, in relative seclusion until the end of his life. His son Franz remembers: “He came back after being away for many years, having previously experienced a decade of severe disappointments - including on a human level. He came back to a country where almost all of his real friends had been murdered or fallen. And he had mostly bad memories of some of the people who had survived and whom he met back then... For him, many places were contaminated by the Nazi era. He came back to a Bavaria that was no longer his Bavaria. The resulting isolation accompanied him throughout his life.”

Albrecht became head of the deposed royal family of Bavaria with the death of his father on 2 August 1955. As head of the House of Wittelsbach, Albrecht was also Grand Master of the Wittelsbach House Orders, the Order of Saint George, the Order of St. Hubert and the Order of Theresa. On Christmas Eve 1952, Albrecht of Bavaria was invested in the Knights' Order of the Holy Sepulchre in Jerusalem; he was president of its Bavarian Order Province.

The Duke appeared in public on important occasions. In order to remain present, he established the annual receptions by the head of the House of Wittelsbach at Nymphenburg Palace, which are still held today, to which around 1,500 guests from state politics, municipalities, churches and sciences, art and medicine as well as friends and relatives are invited.

In 1959 Albrecht, in an official ceremony, returned the Greek crown jewels (originally made for a Bavarian prince who reigned as Greece's first modern monarch, King Otto) to the Greek nation, accepted by King Paul of Greece. Together with his son Franz and a daughter, he had taken part in the ship tours organized by King Paul of Greece and Queen Frederica in 1954 and 1956, which became known as the “Cruises of the Kings” and were attended by over 100 royals from all over Europe.

In 1980 Albrecht presided over sumptuous ceremonies in Bavaria celebrating the 800th anniversary of the ascension of the House of Wittelsbach to the Bavarian throne.

Albrecht was a prolific hunter and deer researcher, collecting 3,425 sets of antlers, now partially shown in a permanent exhibition on his research activities in the former royal castle at Berchtesgaden. He also wrote two books on "the habits of deer" for which he (and his second wife) received honorary doctorates by the biological faculty of the Ludwig-Maximilians-Universität München (LMU). While visiting Brazil in 1953, where he acquired a fazenda in the rainforest, he encountered Brazilian Mastiffs and took some to Germany, introducing the dog breed to Europe.

Albrecht died on 8 July 1996, aged 91, at Berg Palace. His funeral at Theatine Church, Munich was conducted by Friedrich Wetter, the Archbishop of Munich. He was buried in the family graveyard he himself had installed in 1977 at Andechs Abbey.

== Jacobite succession ==
As the eldest surviving son of the eldest son of Archduchess Maria Theresa of Austria-Este (1849–1919), recognized by Jacobites as "Queen Mary IV (of England) and III (of Scotland)", he was also the dynastic representative and heir-general of England, Scotland and Ireland's last Stuart king, James II and VII, deposed in 1688.

== Marriages and children ==
Photographed by Franz Grainer, 1930.

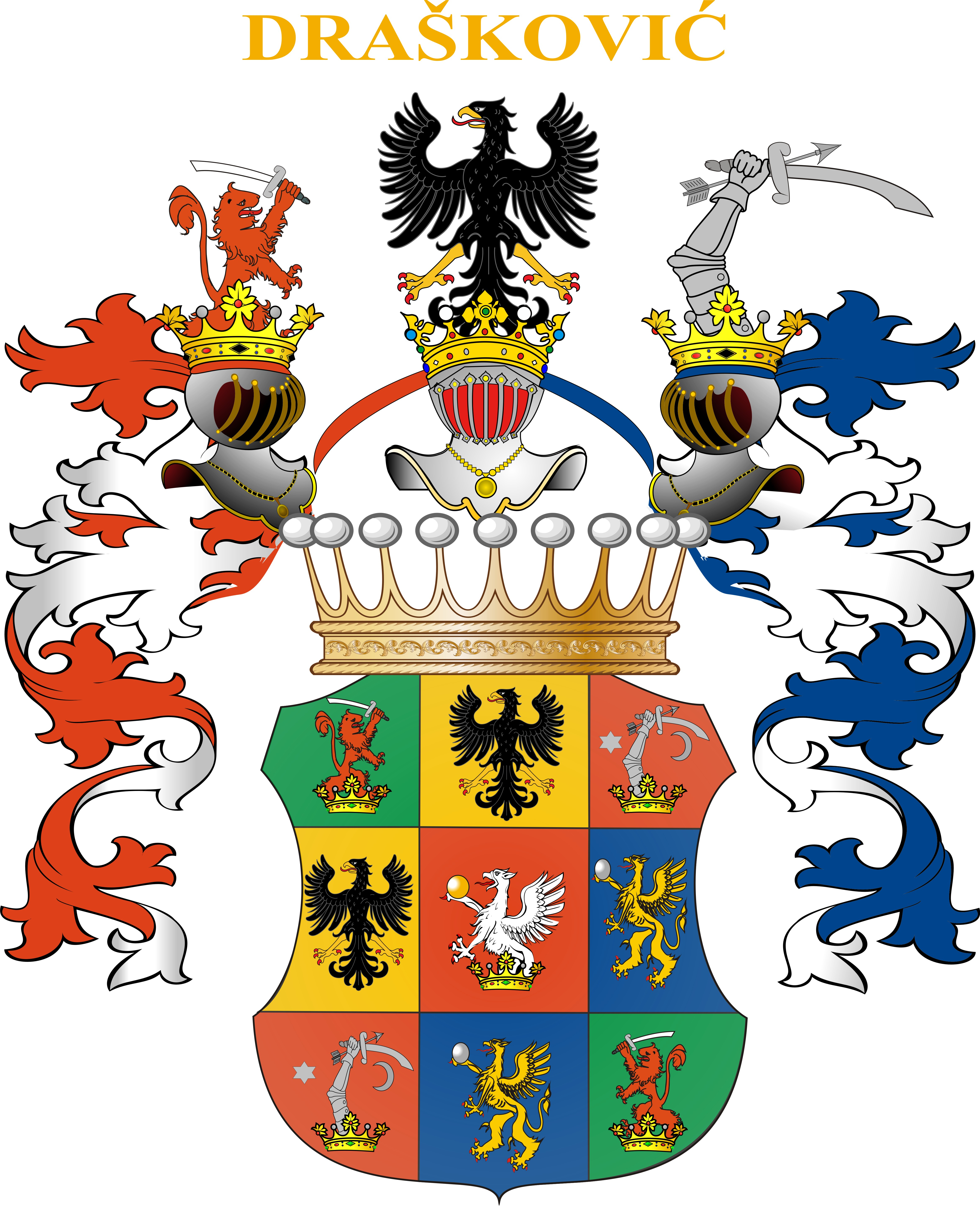
Coat of arms of the Counts Drashkovich of Trakostjan

Albrecht married Countess Maria Draskovich of Trakostjan (8 March 1903 in Vienna – 10 June 1969 in Wildbad Kreuth) on 3 September 1930 in Berchtesgaden. She was the only child of Count Dionys Maria Draskovich of Trakostjan (1875–1909) and his wife, Princess Juliana Rose von Montenuovo (1880–1961) (a great-granddaughter of Marie-Louise of Austria, sometime Empress of the French), belonging to a family of an ancient Croatian nobility known since 1230 and made Imperial counts in 1631. Although the couple were related, both sharing descent from Leopold II, Holy Roman Emperor and Albrecht's father allowed the wedding, a Wittelsbach family council concluded that the marriage was non-compliant with the dynasty's marital tradition as set out in its historical House laws, and the names of the couple's four children were excluded from the Almanach de Gotha. In 1948, however, a juridical consultation advised that the head of the house has sole authority to determine the validity of marriages within the House of Wittelsbach, prompting Crown Prince Rupprecht to recognize Albrecht's marriage as dynastic on 18 May 1949.

On 21 April 1971 in Weichselboden, Albrecht married Countess Marie-Eugenie Jenke Keglevich of Buzin (23 April 1921 in Budapest – 5 October 1983 in Weichselboden), also member of an old Croatian nobility, known since the beginning of the 14th century. She was the youngest daughter of Count Stephan Keglevich of Buzin (1880–1962) and his wife, Countess Klára Mária Theodora Paulina Antonia Josefa Zichy of Zich and Vásonkeö (1883–1971). The marriage produced no children.

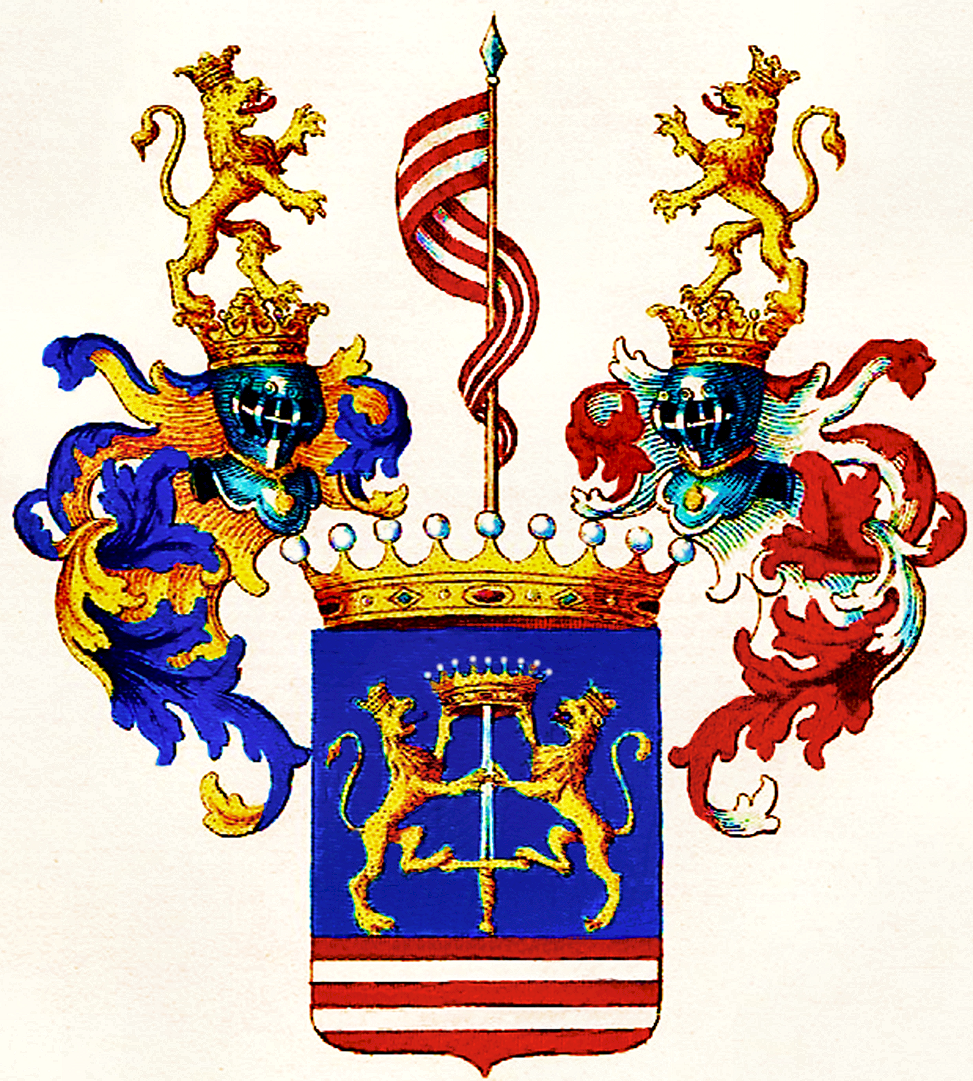
Coat of arms of the Counts Keglevich of Buzin

At the time of his death, Albrecht had four children from his first marriage, fifteen grandchildren and twenty-six great-grandchildren. His children are:

- Princess Marie Gabrielle (b. 1931), married in 1957 to Georg, Prince von Waldburg zu Zeil und Trauchburg (1927–2015)
- Princess Marie Charlotte (1931–2018), married in 1955 to Paul, Prince von Quadt-Wykradt und Isny (1927–2010)
- Franz, Duke of Bavaria (b. 1933)
- Prince Max, Duke in Bavaria (b. 1937), married in 1967 to Countess Elisabeth Douglas-Langenstein (b. 1939), a descendant of Louis I, Grand Duke of Baden and great-granddaughter of Philipp, Prince of Eulenburg and Hertefeld

== Honours and styles ==
=== Titles and styles ===
Albrecht was styled Prinz von Bayern (Prince of Bavaria) at birth. After the death of his father in 1955 he changed his style to Herzog von Bayern (Duke of Bavaria).

As head of the House of Wittelsbach, Albrecht was traditionally styled as His Royal Highness the Duke of Bavaria, of Franconia and in Swabia, Count Palatine of the Rhine.

=== Dynastic honours ===
- (Kingdom of Württemberg) Württemberg Royal Family: Knight Grand Cross of the Royal Order of the Crown, Special Class
- (Austria-Hungary) Austro-Hungarian Imperial and Royal Family: Knight of the Order of the Golden Fleece, 1953

=== Foreign honours ===
- Vatican: Knight Grand Cross with Collar of the Order of the Holy Sepulchre
- Liechtenstein: Knight Grand Cross of the Order of Merit of the Principality of Liechtenstein, Grand Star

== Ancestry ==
Ancestors of Albrecht, Duke of Bavaria

8. Luitpold, Prince Regent of Bavaria
4. Ludwig III of Bavaria
9. Archduchess Augusta of Austria
2. Rupprecht, Crown Prince of Bavaria
10. Archduke Ferdinand Karl Viktor of Austria-Este
5. Archduchess Maria Theresa of Austria-Este
11. Archduchess Elisabeth Franziska of Austria
1. Albrecht, Duke of Bavaria
12. Duke Maximilian Joseph in Bavaria
6. Duke Karl Theodor in Bavaria
13. Princess Ludovika of Bavaria
3. Duchess Marie Gabrielle in Bavaria
14. Miguel I of Portugal
7. Infanta Maria Josepha of Portugal
15. Princess Adelaide of Löwenstein-Wertheim-Rosenberg

== Bibliography ==
Albrecht, Duke of Bavaria House of Wittelsbach Born: 3 May 1905 Died: 8 July 1996
Titles in pretence
Preceded by Rupprecht, Crown Prince of Bavaria	— TITULAR — King of Bavaria; 2 August 1955 – 8 July 1996; Reason for succession failure: Kingdom abolished in 1918	Succeeded by Franz, Duke of Bavaria
Preceded by Rupprecht, Crown Prince of Bavaria	— TITULAR — King of England, Scotland and Ireland; 2 August 1955 – 8 July 1996; Reason for succession failure: Act of Settlement 1701	Succeeded by Franz, Duke of Bavaria
