= Succession to the Liechtensteiner throne =

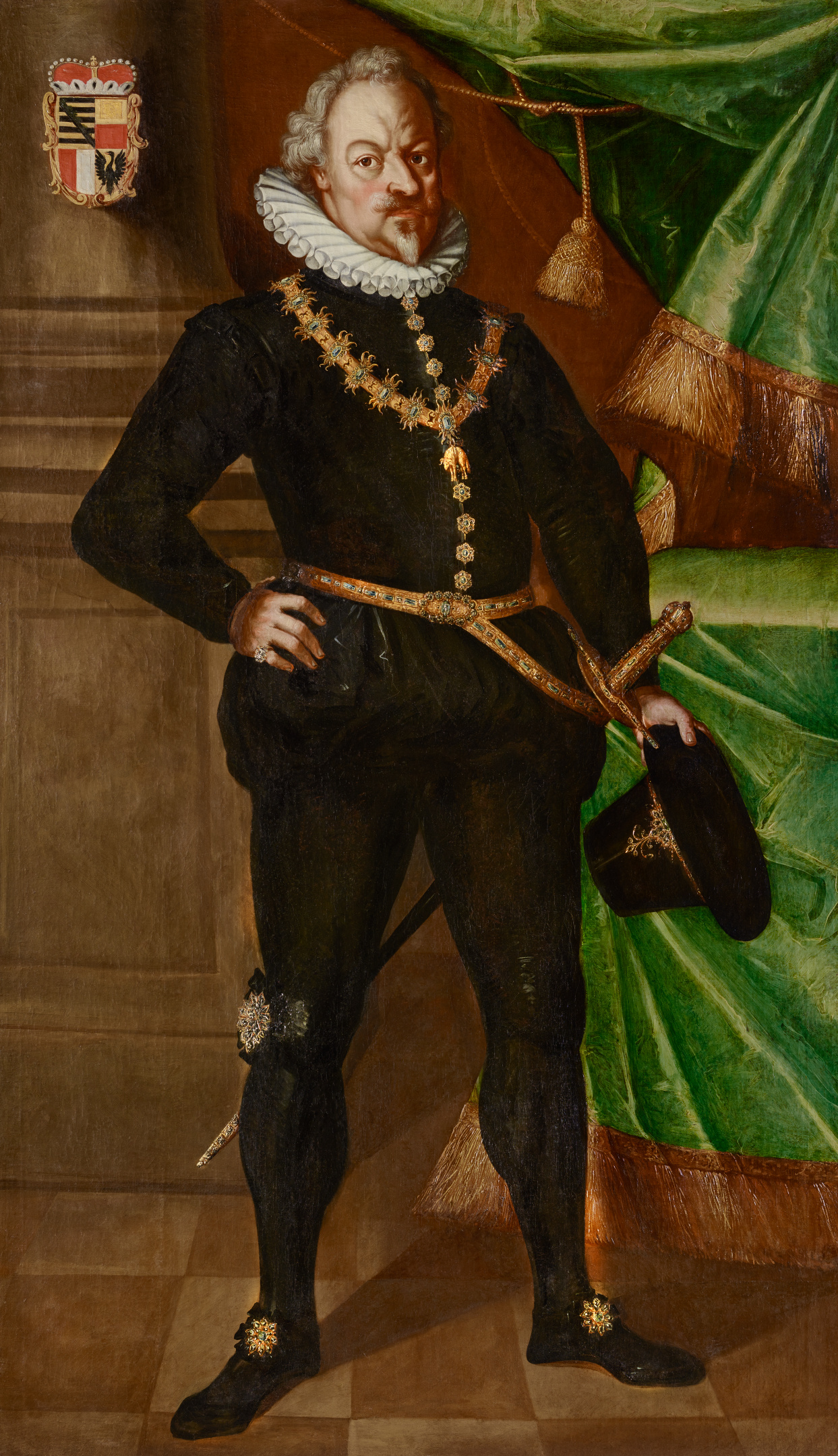
Prince Karl I, who established primogeniture

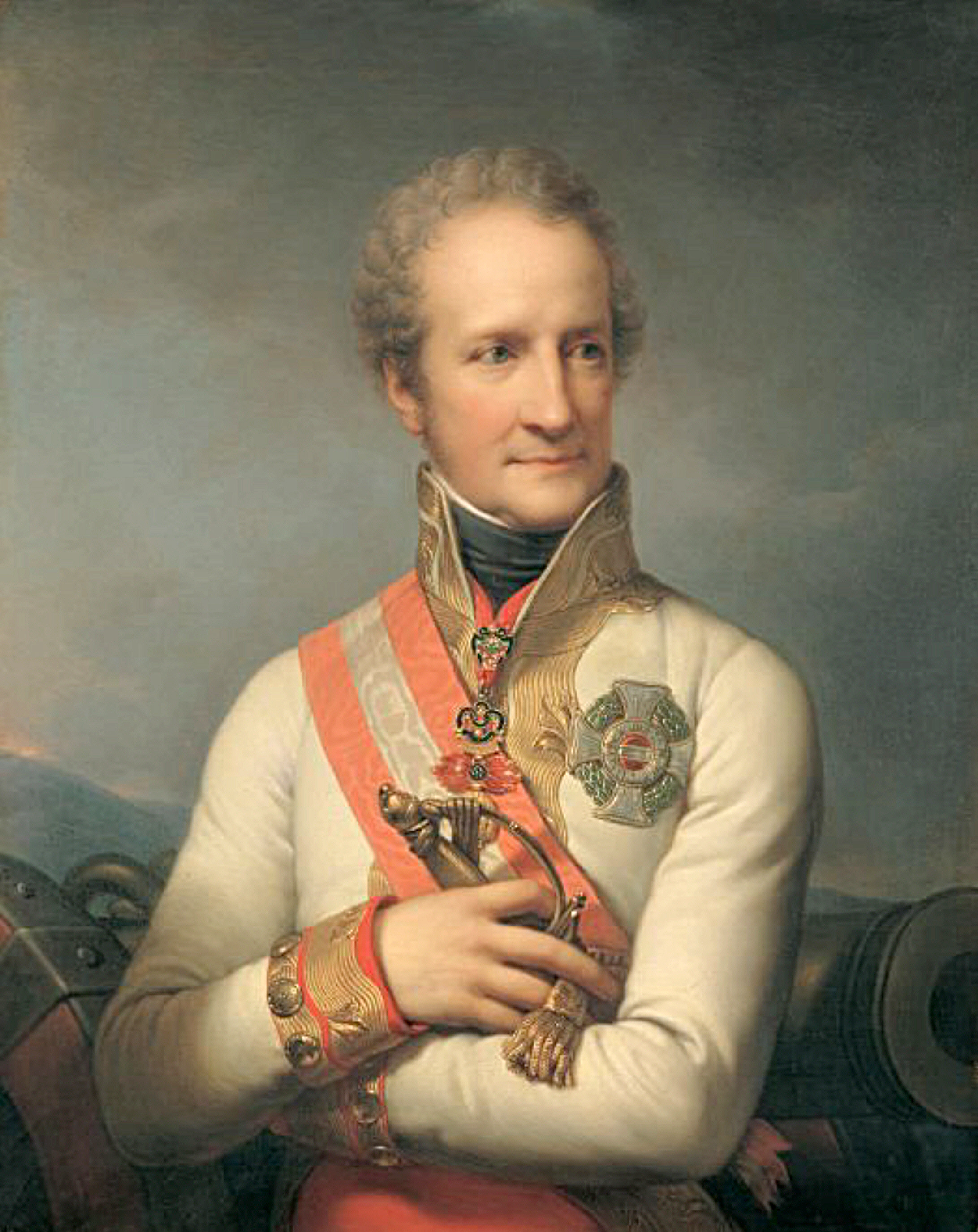
Prince Johann I Joseph, whose legitimate male patrilineal descendants are entitled to succeed

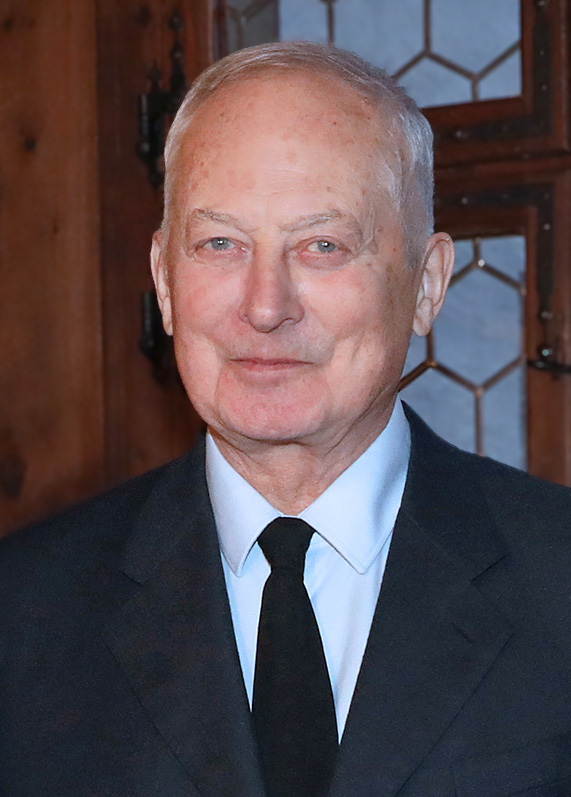
Prince Hans-Adam II, the present monarch

Succession to the Liechtensteiner throne is determined by the Constitution of the Princely House of Liechtenstein, where the throne is inherited by a sovereign's children or by a childless sovereign's nearest collateral line. In August 2026, agnatic (male-only) primogeniture was abandoned, meaning that in future generations females will no longer be excluded from the line of succession.

Hans-Adam II, Prince of Liechtenstein has been the sovereign since 1989, and his heir apparent is his eldest son Alois, Hereditary Prince of Liechtenstein. Alois's eldest son, Prince Joseph Wenzel, is next in line.

== Succession rules ==
In 1606, the first prince of Liechtenstein, Karl I, and his younger brothers, Maximilian and Gundakar, signed a Family Covenant, agreeing that the headship of the family should pass according to agnatic primogeniture to the heir of the most senior line. The family continued to be governed by various statutes until 1993 when the new house law, the Constitution of the Princely House of Liechtenstein, was published on 6 December, repealing all statutes before it. According to the house law, the right to succeed to the throne of Liechtenstein was reserved for male patrilineal descendants of Johann I Joseph, Prince of Liechtenstein born to married parents, excluding issue born of marriage to which the sovereign did not consent. Should there be no more eligible patrilineal descendants left, the sovereign holds the right to adopt an heir presumptive. If a member of the house adopts a prince who is in the line of succession, the adoptee's place in the line will not be altered. The house law also provides for the possibility of renunciation of succession rights.

In addition, the house law allows for the reigning prince to appoint their heir presumptive as a regent. This is the case with the reigning prince Hans-Adam II, Prince of Liechtenstein, who in 2004 appointed heir presumptive Alois, Hereditary Prince of Liechtenstein as his regent, where Alois holds the effective duties as prince but Hans-Adam II remains the prince and head of state officially.

In 2004, Hans-Adam II, Prince of Liechtenstein publicly responded to criticism from a committee of the United Nations which had voiced concerns about the exclusion of women from the line of succession, stating that the rule was older than the state itself. Up until 2026, there was no scenario under which a woman could succeed to the throne of Liechtenstein.

=== 2026 Princely House Law ===
On 15 August 2026, as part of his speech on Liechtenstein National Day, Hereditary Prince Alois announced that the house law would be amended to move from agnatic primogeniture to absolute primogeniture, meaning that in the future women will be eligible to inherit the throne. The changes were approved on 12 August by the required two-thirds of the princely family members with voting rights.

As per the new house rules, all female descendants of the princely house will be granted the same participation rights in matters governed by the house as male descendants. Alois specified that the new succession rules apply to future births in the princely family, and would not affect the current line of succession.

== Line of succession ==
Mark	Type
	Current monarch
	Previous monarch

- Prince Johann I Josef (1760–1836)
  - Prince Franz de Paula (1802–1887)
    - Prince Alfred (1842–1907)
      - Prince Alois (1869–1955)
        - Prince Franz Josef II (1906–1989)
          - Prince Hans-Adam II (born 1945)
            - (1) Hereditary Prince Alois (b. 1968)
              - (2) Prince Joseph Wenzel (b. 1995)
              - (3) Prince Georg (b. 1999)
              - (4) Prince Nikolaus (b. 2000)
            - (5) Prince Maximilian (b. 1969)
              - (6) Prince Alfons (b. 2001)
            - Prince Constantin (1972–2023)
              - (7) Prince Moritz (b. 2003)
              - (8) Prince Benedikt (b. 2008)
          - (9) Prince Philipp (b. 1946)
            - (10) Prince Alexander (b. 1972)
            - (11) Prince Wenzeslaus (b. 1974)
            - (12) Prince Rudolf (b. 1975)
              - (13) Prince Karl Ludwig (b. 2016)
          - (14) Prince Nikolaus (b. 1947)
            - (15) Prince Josef-Emanuel (b. 1989)
              - (16) Prince Leopold (b. 2023)
              - (17) Prince Nikolai (b. 2025)
        - Prince Karl Alfred (1910–1985)
          - (18) Prince Andreas (b. 1952)
          - (19) Prince Gregor (b. 1954)
        - Prince Georg Hartmann (1911–1998)
          - (20) Prince Christoph (b. 1958)
        - Prince Heinrich Hartneid (1920–1993)
          - (21) Prince Hubertus (b. 1971)
            - (22) Prince Leopold (b. 2014)
      - Prince Johannes (1873–1959)
        - Prince Alfred (1907–1991)
          - Prince Franz (1935–2026)
            - (23) Prince Alfred (b. 1972)
              - (24) Prince Franz (b. 2009)
            - (25) Prince Lukas (b. 1974)
          - Prince Friedrich (1937–2010)
            - (26) Prince Emanuel (b. 1978)
              - (27) Prince Leopold (b. 2010)
              - (28) Prince Heinrich (b. 2012)
            - (29) Prince Ulrich (b. 1983)
          - (30) Prince Anton (b. 1940)
            - (31) Prince Georg (b. 1977)
        - Prince Johannes (1910–1975)
          - (32) Prince Eugen (b. 1939)
            - (33) Prince Johannes (b. 1969)
      - Prince Alfred Roman (1875–1930)
        - Prince Hans-Moritz (1914–2004)
          - (34) Prince Gundakar (b. 1949)
            - (35) Prince Johann (b. 1993)
            - (36) Prince Gabriel (b. 1998)
          - (37) Prince Alfred (b. 1951)
          - (38) Prince Karl (b. 1955)
          - (39) Prince Hugo (b. 1964)
        - Prince Heinrich (1916–1991)
          - (40) Prince Michael (b. 1951)
          - (41) Prince Christoph (b. 1956)
          - (42) Prince Karl (b. 1957)
      - Prince Karl Aloys (1878–1955)
        - (43) Prince Wolfgang (b. 1934)
          - (44) Prince Leopold (b. 1978)
            - (45) Prince Lorenz (b. 2012)
  - Prince Eduard Franz (1809–1864)
    - Prince Aloys (1840–1885)
      - Prince Friedrich (1871–1959)
        - Prince Aloys (1898–1943)
          - Prince Luitpold (1940–2016)
            - (46) Prince Carl (b. 1978)
        - Prince Alfred (1900–1972)
          - Prince Alexander (1929–2012)
            - (47) Prince Christian (b. 1961)
              - (48) Prince Augustinus (b. 1992)
              - (49) Prince Johannes (b. 1995)
            - (50) Prince Stefan (b. 1961)
              - (51) Prince Lukas (b. 1990)
              - (52) Prince Konrad (b. 1992)
            - (53) Prince Emanuel (b. 1964)
              - (54) Prince Josef (b. 1998)

== See also ==
- Constitution of the Princely House of Liechtenstein
- List of princes of Liechtenstein
