= Royal Stuart Society =

Jacobitist organisation founded in 1926

- Abbreviation: RSS
- Formation: 1926
- Type: Monarchist, Traditionalist
- Headquarters: Walsingham, Norfolk, England
- Governor-General: Charles Beauclerk, 15th Duke of St Albans
- Website: royalstuartsociety.com

The Royal Stuart Society, founded in 1926, is the largest extant Jacobite organisation in the United Kingdom. Its full name is The Royal Stuart Society and Royalist League, although it is best known simply as the "Royal Stuart Society". It acknowledges Francis, Duke of Bavaria as head of the House of Stuart, while refraining from making any claim on his behalf that he does not make himself.

The society organises annual events to commemorate the major anniversaries of Jacobitism and other events of Royalist interest.

== History ==
After the First World War, the Jacobite movement was in disarray. The Royal Stuart Society was established by Captain Henry Stuart Wheatly-Crowe, who served as its first Governor-General, and representatives of the Royalist Association and other defunct or moribund bodies that supported the Jacobite succession to the British throne.

The Royal Stuart Society considers itself a successor to, and effectively the continuation of, bodies of the Neo-Jacobite Revival, such as the Legitimist Jacobite League of Great Britain and Ireland (founded in 1891 by Herbert Vivian, Ruaraidh Erskine and Melville Henry Massue), the Order of the White Rose and the Thames Valley Legitimist Club. Among its other founders were Lionel Erskine-Young, 29th Earl of Mar (1891–1965) and Reginald Lindesay-Bethune, 12th Earl of Lindsay (1867–1939).

== Objectives ==
The objectives of the Royal Stuart Society are:

1. To be open to all who have an interest in the members of the Royal House of Stuart, their descendants and supporters.
2. To promote research in and further knowledge of Stuart history.
3. To uphold Monarchy and oppose republicanism.
4. To arrange commemorations, lectures and other activities.

It describes itself on its website as being “monarchist and traditionalist”.

== Leadership ==
Until his death in 2026, the Governor-General was Murray Beauclerk, 14th Duke of St Albans, a descendant of Stuart monarch King Charles II and his mistress, Nell Gwyn, through their illegitimate son, Charles Beauclerk, 1st Duke of St Albans. His son, Charles Beauclerk, 15th Duke of St Albans, was appointed to succeed him as Governor-General in July 2026.

Other Vice-Presidents of the Royal Stuart Society include:

- Princess Lew Sapieha, a Polish-Lithuanian noble
- Prince Filippo Rospigliosi, 12th Earl of Newburgh, a Scottish peer
- Count Nikolai Tolstoy, a British monarchist and historian, and current nominal head of the House of Tolstoy
- Ian Maitland, 18th Earl of Lauderdale, a Scottish peer
- Lucius Cary, 15th Viscount Falkland, a British nobleman and politician
- Edward Corp, former Professor of British History at the University of Toulouse in Toulouse, France
- Antonia Fraser, a British author of history, novels, biographies and detective fiction

== Activities ==
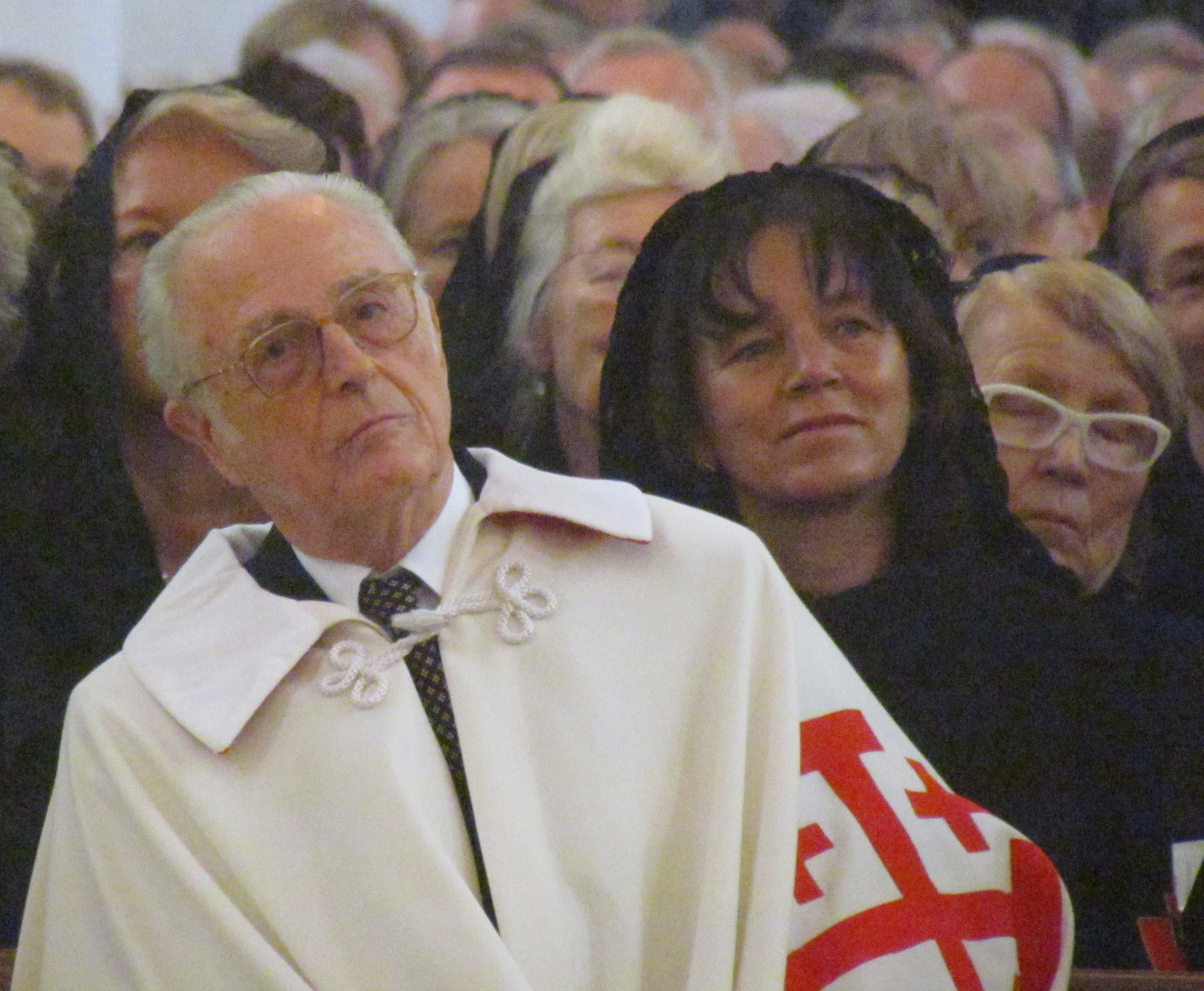
Franz, Duke of Bavaria, the current de facto claimant to the Jacobite succession as "King Francis II", recognised by the Royal Stuart Society, in the regalia of the Order of the Holy Sepulchre in Munich, Germany.

The Society organises events throughout the year. A service to commemorate the execution of Charles I of England is held at his statue in Trafalgar Square on 30 January each year, and a wreath is laid on the King's tomb at St George's Chapel, Windsor, at the beginning of Choral Evensong. The execution of Mary, Queen of Scots is remembered with a Service at her tomb in Westminster Abbey on 8 February. The nativity of King James VII and II of Scotland and England is occasionally marked by prayers and the laying of flowers at his statue outside the National Gallery on 14 October.

The Society holds an annual dinner, commemorating Restoration Day and White Rose Day. Lectures take place in London. The Society previously published the Royal Stuart Journal annually, which had itself replaced a series of publications called Royal Stuart Papers, which included papers by various well known historians, including Roy Porter, Richard Sharpe, Murray Pittock, Eveline Cruickshanks, Antonia Fraser and Ronald Hutton.
