= 2012 Liechtenstein constitutional referendum =

- 1 July 2012
- Referendum on modifying articles 9, 65, 66 and 112 of the constitution.

Results
Choice	Votes	%
Yes	3,602	23.57%
No	11,681	76.43%
Valid votes	15,283	96.69%
Invalid or blank votes	524	3.31%
Total votes	15,807	100.00%
Registered voters/turnout	19,076	82.86%
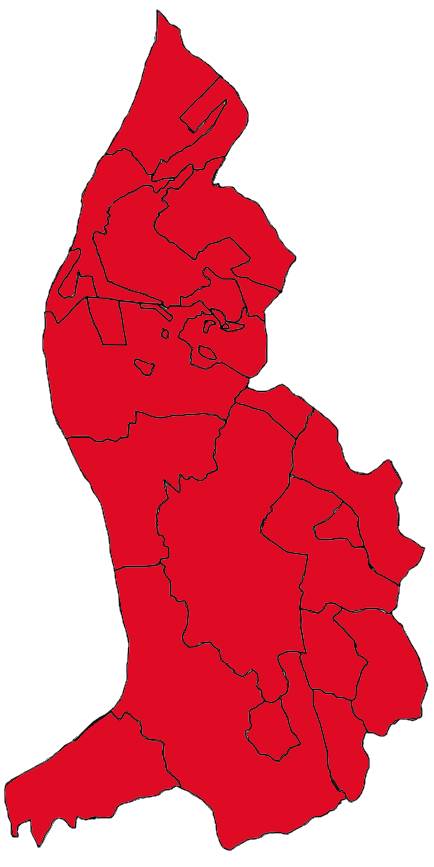
- Results by municipality

A constitutional referendum was held in Liechtenstein on 1 July 2012 concerning limiting the extensive veto powers held by the Prince of Liechtenstein. The proposals were rejected by 76% of voters.

== Background ==
Prior to the 2011 referendum on abortion, Regent Alois had threatened to veto the change to the law to allow voluntary abortion in the first twelve weeks of pregnancy even if the referendum passed.

The question was agreed on 9 February, and 1,732 signatures were collected between 29 March and 9 May. Of these, 1,726 were declared valid, exceeding the 1,500 required to force a referendum. The Landtag rejected the law on 23 May by a vote of 18 to 7 and subsequently set the date of the referendum.

== Proposed changes ==
The proposed changes would have modified articles 9, 65, 66 and 112 of the constitution. Article 9 stated "Every law requires for its validity the sanction of the Prince", and would have been amended to add "or approval in a referendum." From Article 65, the following sentence would have been deleted: "If the sanction of the Prince is not received within six months, it shall be deemed to be denied."

== Campaign ==
As a result, an initiative called "Damit deine Stimme zählt" ("So that your voice counts") was launched to change the constitution to prevent the Prince from vetoing legislation approved in referendums. To counter the campaign, opponents of the change set up a group called "Für Gott, Fürst und Vaterland" ("For God, prince and fatherland"; which is the motto of Liechtenstein as well as its National Police).

The Princely family threatened to veto the referendum if it resulted in a vote in favour of removing the veto, whilst Alois threatened to resign if it passed.

== Results ==
Choice	Votes	%
For	3,602	23.57
Against	11,681	76.43
Total	15,283	100.00
Valid votes	15,283	96.69
Invalid/blank votes	524	3.31
Total votes	15,807	100.00
Registered voters/turnout	19,076	82.86
Source: Direct Democracy
