= Alois, Hereditary Prince of Liechtenstein =

Regent of Liechtenstein since 2004

Alois
- Hereditary Prince of Liechtenstein; Count of Rietberg
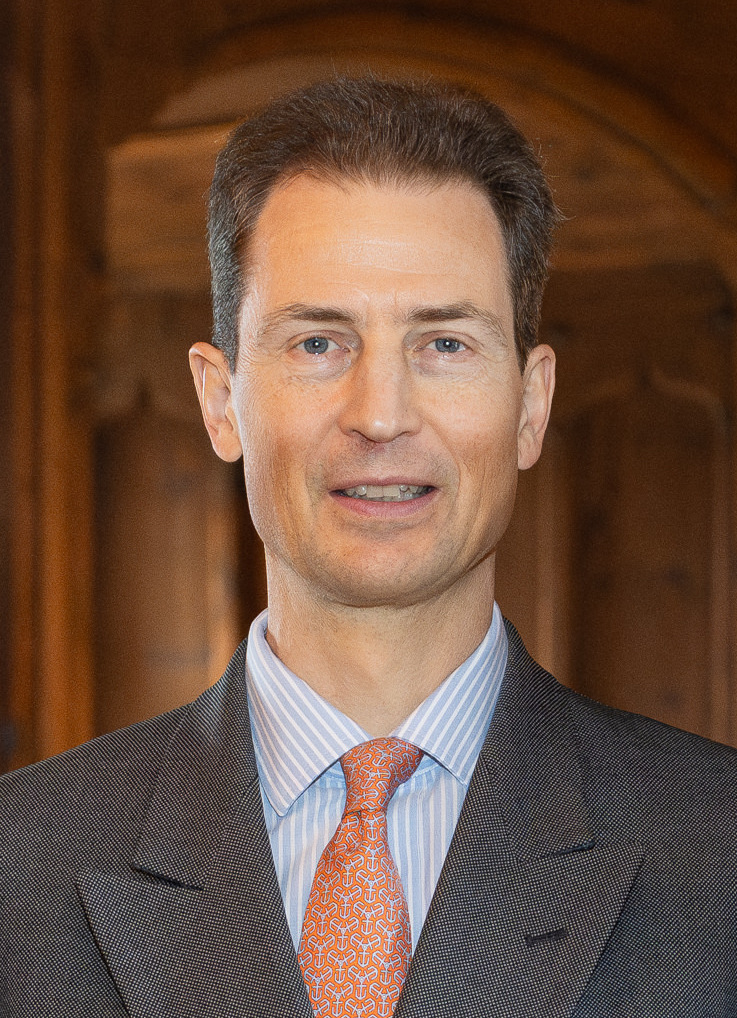
- Alois in 2024

Regent of Liechtenstein
- Regency: 15 August 2004 – present
- Monarch: Hans-Adam II
- Born: 11 June 1968 (age 58); Zürich, Switzerland
- Spouse: Duchess Sophie in Bavaria (m. 1993)
- Issue: Prince Joseph Wenzel; Princess Marie Caroline; Prince Georg Antonius; Prince Nikolaus Sebastian
Names
- Alois Philipp Maria
- House: Liechtenstein
- Father: Hans-Adam II of Liechtenstein
- Mother: Countess Marie Kinsky of Wchinitz and Tettau
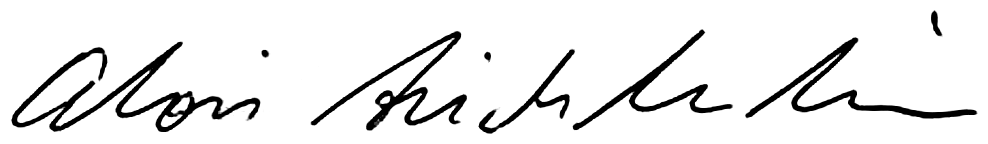
- Signature

Alois, Hereditary Prince of Liechtenstein, Count of Rietberg (Alois Philipp Maria; born 11 June 1968) is the eldest son of Hans-Adam II of Liechtenstein, and his wife, Princess Marie née Countess Marie Kinsky von Wchinitz und Tettau. He is the heir apparent to the throne of Liechtenstein. Alois has been regent of the country since 15 August 2004, while his father remains the head of state.

He also holds the title of Count of Rietberg. He married Duchess Sophie in Bavaria, who is a member of the House of Wittelsbach, and second in line for the Jacobite succession.

== Early life ==
Alois attended the Liechtensteinisches Gymnasium in Vaduz and then the Royal Military Academy Sandhurst in the United Kingdom. He was a second lieutenant serving in the Coldstream Guards in Hong Kong and London for six months, resigning his commission in the Coldstream Guards on 8 August 1988. He entered the University of Salzburg, from which he earned a master's degree in jurisprudence in 1993. Until 1996, Alois worked at a firm of chartered accountants in London. In May of that year, he returned to Vaduz and became active in managing the princely family's finances.

== Hereditary prince ==
In the 2003 Liechtenstein constitutional referendum, Alois and his father Hans-Adam II pushed for constitutional amendments that granted the prince sweeping powers (the right to veto laws and elect judges). Hans-Adam had threatened to abdicate the throne and leave the country if it was not successful. However, it was accepted by voters. The next year, on 15 August 2004, Hans-Adam made Alois his regent and turned over the powers of prince to him, though Hans-Adam remains the official head of state, much like his father Franz Joseph II had done for him in 1984.

On 27 November 2005, Liechtenstein voters rejected an initiative that would prohibit abortion and birth control in the country. The initiative was supported by Roman Catholic Archbishop Wolfgang Haas. Alois was initially sympathetic to the proposal, but he became neutral during the run-up to the vote. Instead, a government-sponsored counter-proposal was ratified. In 2011, Alois announced he would veto any relaxing of the ban on abortion in Liechtenstein, which was to be the subject of a referendum later that year. Such a veto was not necessary, however, as the voters rejected the proposal.

Following the prince's threat, an initiative called "Damit deine Stimme zählt" ("So that your voice counts") was launched to change the constitution of Liechtenstein to prevent the prince from vetoing legislation approved in referendums. The referendum was held on 1 July 2012, and 76% of voters upheld the prince's power to veto referendum results.

On 11 August 2022, Prince Alois said that same-sex marriage is "not a major problem". In a speech made in August 2024, he supported Liechtenstein's accession to the International Monetary Fund.

In October 2026, the prince vetoed down an initiative for legalizing abortion which had been backed by the Landtag, exercising the power for the first time.

=== 2026 princely house law ===
On 15 August 2026, as part of his speech on Liechtenstein National Day, Hereditary Prince Alois announced that the house law would be amended to move from agnatic primogeniture to absolute primogeniture, meaning that in the future women will be eligible to inherit the throne. The changes were approved on 12 August by the required two-thirds of the princely family members with voting rights.

As per the new house rules, all female descendants of the princely house will be granted the same participation rights in matters governed by the house as male descendants. Alois specified that the new succession rules apply to future births in the princely family, and would not affect the current line of succession.

== Personal wealth ==
Alois is set to inherit an extensive art collection, much of which is displayed for the public at the Gartenpalais Liechtenstein in Vienna. As of July 2022, his father's net worth was estimated by Bloomberg Billionaires Index around US$6.20 billion, making him the 380th richest person on earth. However, he placed these assets in a family foundation, the Prince of Liechtenstein Foundation, from which each family member receives an equal annual allowance and which maintains the family's castles, cultural assets, collections and museums and last but not least, the costs of the princely court including even some salaries for princes who are ambassadors abroad, which are not a burden on the taxpayer.

== Marriage and issue ==
On 3 July 1993 at St. Florin's Cathedral in Vaduz, Alois married Duchess Sophie in Bavaria, now also Hereditary Princess of Liechtenstein and Countess of Rietberg.

They have four children:

- Prince Joseph Wenzel Maximilian Maria of Liechtenstein, Count of Rietberg (born 24 May 1995 at Portland Hospital in London). Educated at Malvern College.
- Princess Marie Caroline Elisabeth Immaculata of Liechtenstein, Countess of Rietberg (born 17 October 1996 in Grabs, Canton of St. Gallen). Graduated from Parsons Paris School of Art and Design in 2020. Married to Venezuelan investor Leopoldo Maduro, grandnephew of Gustavo J. Vollmer; on 30 August 2025, in Vaduz Cathedral.
- Prince Georg Antonius Constantin Maria of Liechtenstein, Count of Rietberg (born 20 April 1999 in Grabs). He attended Malvern College and graduated in 2017. He then studied at the University of St. Gallen and continued his education at the ESCP Business School. Professionally known as Georg Liechtenstein, he worked as a visiting analyst at Atlantic Labs in Berlin now he lives and works in New York City in the tech sector. In August 2026 he became officially engaged to Princess Maria Nives von der Leyen.
- Prince Nikolaus Sebastian Alexander Maria of Liechtenstein, Count of Rietberg (born 6 December 2000 in Grabs).

== Honours ==
=== National ===
- Liechtenstein: Grand Star of the Order of Merit of the Principality of Liechtenstein.

=== Foreign ===
- Austria: Grand Decoration of Honour in Gold with Sash for Services to the Republic of Austria (08/06/2000).
- Netherlands: Recipient of the King Willem-Alexander Inauguration Medal (04/30/2013).
- Sweden: Recipient of the King Carl XVI Gustaf's Jubilee Commemorative Medal for the 70th Birthday (04/30/2016).
- Sovereign Military Order of Malta: Grand Cross pro Merito Melitensi – civilian special class – (09/16/2011).

== Arms ==
Coat of arms of Alois, Hereditary Prince of Liechtenstein
Coronet Ducal hat of Liechtenstein Escutcheon Quarterly: I Or, an eagle displayed Sable crowned and armed Or charged with a crescent treflée, issuing from the middle thereof a cross pattée Argent (Silesia); II barry of eight Or and Sable, a crown of rue bendways throughout Vert (Kuenring); III per pale Gules and Argent (Duchy of Troppau); IV Or, a harpy displayed Sable the human parts Argent crowned and armed Or (Cirksena); on a point entée Azure, a bugle-horn stringed Or (Duchy of Jägerndorf); en surtout, an inescutcheon per fess or and Gules (House of Liechtenstein).

== See also ==
- List of current heirs apparent

Alois, Hereditary Prince of Liechtenstein House of Liechtenstein Born: 11 June 1968
Liechtensteiner royalty
Preceded by Hans-Adam II	Hereditary Prince of Liechtenstein; 13 November 1989 – present	Incumbent; Heir: Prince Joseph Wenzel
Lines of succession
First	Line of succession to the Liechtensteiner throne	Succeeded by Prince Joseph Wenzel
