= Sophie, Hereditary Princess of Liechtenstein =

Sophie
- Hereditary Princess of Liechtenstein; Countess of Rietberg
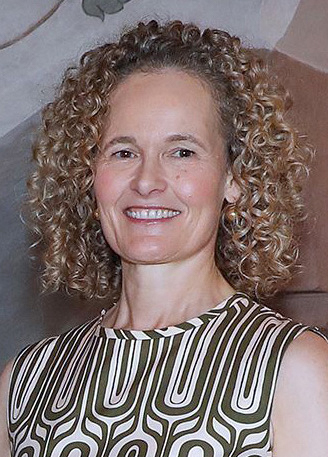
- Sophie in 2024
- Born: Sophie Elisabeth Marie Gabrielle Herzogin in Bayern; 28 October 1967 (age 58); Munich, West Germany
- Spouse: Alois, Hereditary Prince of Liechtenstein (m. 1993)
- Issue: Prince Joseph Wenzel; Princess Marie Caroline; Prince Georg; Prince Nikolaus
- House: Wittelsbach
- Father: Prince Max, Duke in Bavaria
- Mother: Countess Elisabeth Douglas

Sophie, Hereditary Princess of Liechtenstein, Countess of Rietberg (née Sophie Elisabeth Marie Gabrielle Herzogin in Bayern; born 28 October 1967) is married to Alois, Hereditary Prince and Regent of Liechtenstein. She was born a member of the House of Wittelsbach, with the courtesy title of Duchess in Bavaria, and second in line for the Jacobite succession.

== Early life and education ==
Duchess Sophie was born in Bavaria, Munich, the eldest of the five daughters of Prince Max, Duke in Bavaria, and Princess Elisabeth, Duchess in Bavaria (née Countess Douglas), as well as a patrilineal great-great-granddaughter of the last King of Bavaria, Ludwig III. She was born in Munich on 28 October 1967 and baptised as Sophie Elizabeth Marie Gabrielle in the chapel of her family's Kreuth home on 18 November. Her godparents were her maternal aunt the Duchess of Marlborough and Princess Anna Gabriele of Wrede.

Sophie spent her childhood together with her parents and sisters in Wildbad Kreuth. From 1978 to 1980, Sophie attended the Girls' Home Primary School of the English Lady in Heiligenstadt. She then moved to the Girls' Secondary Boarding School Hohenburg in Lenggries. Sophie then studied history and English language and literature at the Catholic University of Eichstätt-Ingolstadt. She also attended Inchbald School of Design in London.

== Marriage and children ==
Duchess Sophie in Bavaria met Alois, Hereditary Prince of Liechtenstein at her cousin's birthday party in Munich. The couple married on 3 July 1993 at Cathedral of St. Florin in Vaduz, Liechtenstein. They lived in London from September 1993 until May 1996, and have since then resided in Vaduz, Liechtenstein. They have four children:

- Prince Joseph Wenzel Maximilian Maria of Liechtenstein, Count of Rietberg (born 24 May 1995 at Portland Hospital in London, England, United Kingdom). Educated at Malvern College in Worcestershire, England.
- Princess Marie Caroline Elisabeth Immaculata of Liechtenstein, Countess of Rietberg (born 17 October 1996 in Grabs, Canton of St. Gallen). She initially attended Ebenholz Primary School in Vaduz and the International School Rheintal in Buchs, Switzerland before completing her secondary studies at Malvern College in Worcestershire, England. Princess Marie Caroline obtained Bachelor of Fine Arts degree in fashion design from Parsons Paris School of Art and Design in 2020. She works in the fashion industry in London. Married Venezuelan investor Leopoldo Maduro Vollmer on 30 August 2025 at Vaduz Cathedral.
- Prince Georg Antonius Constantin Maria of Liechtenstein, Count of Rietberg (born 20 April 1999 in Grabs). He attended Malvern College and graduated in 2017. He then studied at the University of St. Gallen and continued his education at the ESCP Business School. Professionally known as Georg Liechtenstein, he works as a visiting analyst at Atlantic Labs in Berlin.
- Prince Nikolaus Sebastian Alexander Maria of Liechtenstein, Count of Rietberg (born 6 December 2000 in Grabs).

She became a naturalized Liechtenstein citizen after her marriage.

== Illness ==
At the beginning of 2003, it was made public that Sophie had been diagnosed with a benign brain tumor, from which she has recovered.

== Activities ==
Hereditary Princess Sophie serves as a patron for many organizations and events, often relating to children, education and the arts. She regularly visited social institutions such as hospitals, nursing homes and auctions. The Hereditary Princess often accompanies her husband on foreign visits, as well as many events within Liechtenstein itself.

In 2006, the Hereditary Princess founded the Sophie von Liechtenstein Stiftung für Frau und Kind (Sophie of Liechtenstein Foundation for Woman and Child). The foundation's purpose is to give women who unintentionally became pregnant a more positive life perspective for themselves and their children. The foundation has three offices – in Liechtenstein, Vorarlberg and St. Gallen – and is funded by the Liechtenstein princely family and by private donations. The Hereditary Princess serves as president and trustee. Sophie also founded a pregnancy counseling service named schwanger.li in Schaan, Buchs, and Feldkirch. In April 2022, the foundation and Liechtenstein Red Cross launch the "Liechtenstein Family Network" project to support parents with young children from the age of 0 to 5 years in order to promote healthy development of children.

Hereditary Princess Sophie has served as a president of the Liechtenstein Red Cross since 2015. In March 2022, as president of the Red Cross, Hereditary Princess Sophie was interviewed by Radio Liechtenstein, discussing Liechtenstein's contribution to the International Red Cross's Ukraine relief funds during the Russian invasion of Ukraine. She is also a patron of the Liechtenstein Animal Welfare Association. In addition, she supports Caritas Liechtenstein, an organisation that provides financial support to those facing severe financial troubles. She also visited Gamander Children's Home, a shelter home for orphaned and abandoned children. In September 2022, Sophie became the patron of the Heilpädagogische Zentrum in Liechtenstein (Special Education Center in Liechtenstein).

== Honours and arms ==
=== National ===
- Liechtenstein:
  - Grand Star of the Order of Merit of the Principality of Liechtenstein.

=== Foreign ===
- Austria : Grand Decoration of Honour in Gold with Sash for Services to the Republic of Austria, 2018.
- Netherlands: Recipient of King Willem-Alexander Inauguration Medal, 2013.
- Sweden: Recipient of the King Carl XVI Gustaf's Jubilee Commemorative Medal for the 70th Birthday, 2016.

=== Arms ===
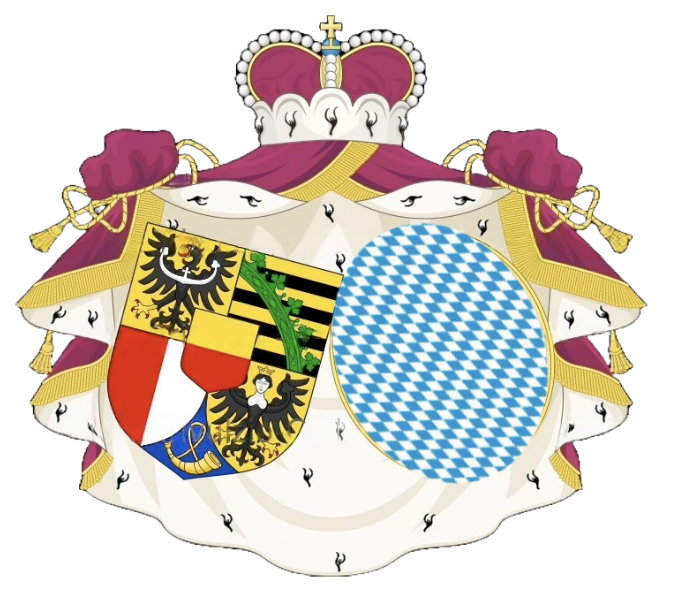

== See also ==
- Princely Family of Liechtenstein
- Jacobite Succession

== Footnotes ==
Lines of succession
Preceded by Prince Max, Duke in Bavaria	— TITULAR — Jacobite succession 2nd position	Succeeded by Prince Joseph Wenzel of Liechtenstein
