= Jacobite succession =

Post-1688 claim of succession of the British crowns

Monument to the Royal Stuarts
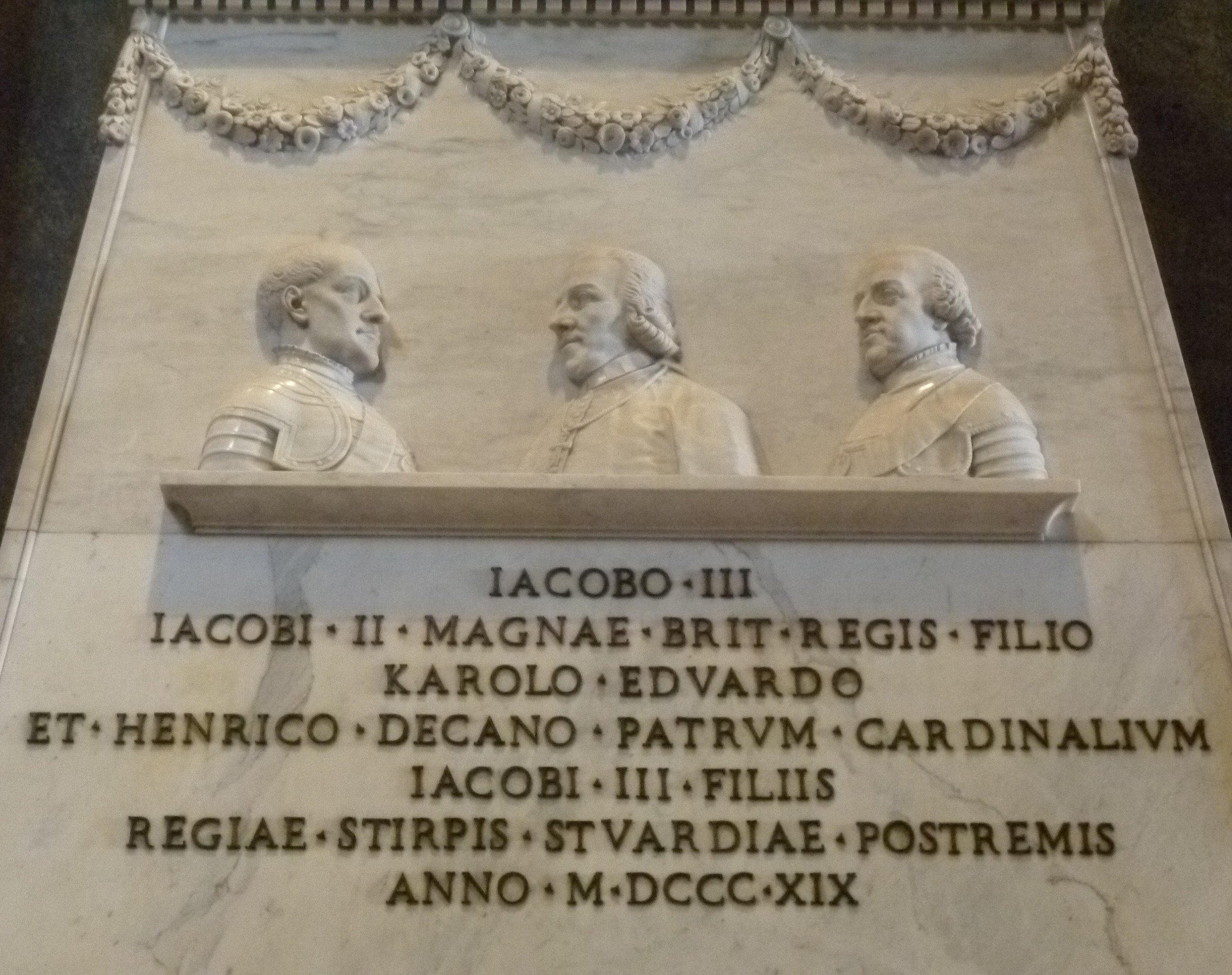

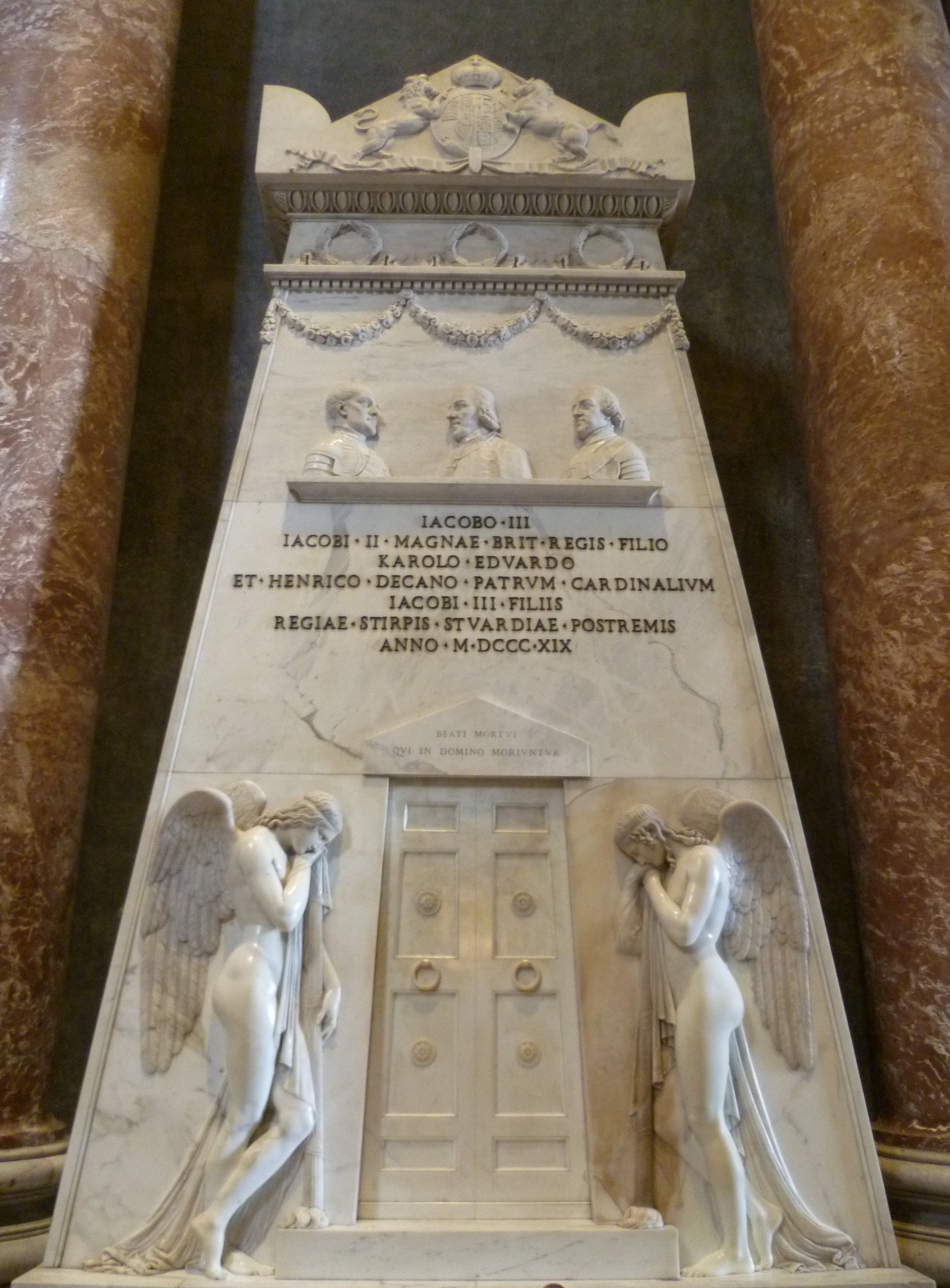
Memorial to the three Stuart pretenders, "James III", and his sons, Charles and Henry, above their place of interment in the crypt of St. Peter's Basilica, in the Vatican. By Antonio Canova, 1819.

The Jacobite succession is the line through which Jacobites believe that the crowns of England, Scotland, and Ireland should have descended, applying male preference primogeniture, since the deposition of James II and VII in 1688 and his death in 1701. It is in opposition to the legal line of succession to the British throne since that time.

Excluded from the succession by law because of their Catholicism, James's Stuart descendants pursued their claims to the crowns as pretenders. James's son James Francis Edward Stuart (the "Old Pretender") and grandson Charles Edward Stuart (the "Young Pretender" or "Bonnie Prince Charlie") actively participated in uprisings and invasions in support of their claim. From 1689 to the middle of the eighteenth century, restoration of the Jacobite succession to the throne was a major political issue in Britain, with adherents both at home and abroad. However, with Charles Edward's disastrous defeat at the Battle of Culloden in 1746, the Jacobite succession lost both its support and its political importance. James II and VII's other grandson, Henry Benedict Stuart, was the last of his legitimate descendants, as he took a career as a Catholic prelate and as such never married. Henry Benedict Stuart died in 1807, by which time the Jacobite succession ceased to have supporters in any number.

When Henry died childless, the Jacobite claim was then notionally inherited by Henry's nearest relative (a second cousin, twice removed), and then passed through a number of European royal families. Although the line of succession can continue to be traced, none of these subsequent heirs ever claimed the British throne, or the crowns of England, Scotland, or Ireland. A spokesman for the current heir, Franz, Duke of Bavaria, has described his position in the line of succession as "purely hypothetical" and a question "which does not concern him". However, there remains a small number of modern supporters, who believe in the restoration of the Jacobite succession to the throne.

== History ==
=== Background: the Glorious Revolution and Hanoverian succession ===
James II and VII, a Roman Catholic, was deposed, in what became known as the Glorious Revolution, when his Protestant opponents forced him to flee from England in 1688. The English parliament deemed that James had, by fleeing his realms, abdicated his thrones. In theory, the deemed abdication applied to the crown of Ireland as well, as the English monarch was, in law, automatically also the monarch of Ireland. (Note: In fact, the Irish Parliament did not follow the example of the English Parliament; it declared that James remained King and passed a massive bill of attainder against those who had rebelled against him.) In practice, James's loss of the Irish crown to William of Orange was because of his defeat in the Williamite War in Ireland in 1691. A Convention of the Scottish Estates took a different approach to the English parliament, and declared that James, by his wrongdoing, had forfeited the crown. Both offered the crowns, not to James's infant son, but to his adult Protestant daughter Mary and to her husband and cousin, James's nephew, William of Orange.

William and Mary were succeeded by James's younger daughter and Mary's sister, Anne, also a Protestant, who became Queen in 1702. The Act of Settlement 1701, passed shortly before Anne's accession, fixed the line of succession in law with the aim of permanently excluding James's descendants, and Roman Catholics in general, from the throne. The Parliament of England first barred Roman Catholics and James's descendants from inheriting the throne through the Bill of Rights 1689. The 1701 Act both confirmed these provisions and added to them by clarifying the line of succession should Anne die without surviving issue. As an English Act of Parliament, it was originally only part of English law, applying to the throne of England, but also to the throne of Ireland as the monarch of England was automatically also monarch of Ireland under the Irish Parliament's Crown of Ireland Act 1542. By virtue of Article II of the Treaty of Union between England and Scotland (put into law by the Acts of Union 1707), which defined the succession to the throne of Great Britain, the Act of Settlement became part of Scots law as well. The succession after Anne (who would die without leaving surviving children) was effectively settled on the Protestant House of Hanover. The Act named Anne's first cousin once removed, Sophia of Hanover, a granddaughter of James VI and I, and her descendants, as Anne's successor. Sophia died a few months before Anne, and Sophia's son, George I, consequently acceded to the British throne on Anne's death in 1714.

=== Stuart claims in exile ===
James II and VII, his son, James, the 'Old Pretender', and his grandsons, Charles, the 'Young Pretender' and Henry, Cardinal of York, never accepted the loss of their crowns and continued to press their claims from exile to varying degrees. They were supported by Jacobites in England, Ireland, and, particularly, in Scotland. The Jacobite succession, as a dynastic alternative for the throne, became a major factor in destabilising British politics between 1689 and 1746. Jacobitism was perceived by contemporaries to be a significant military and political threat, with invasions and uprisings in support of the exiled Stuarts occurring in 1689, 1715, 1719 and 1745.

Internationally, the Jacobite succession had limited recognition. Only France, Spain and the Papacy acknowledged James II's son as 'James III' on his father's death in 1701. By the Peace of Utrecht, France and Spain switched their recognition to the Hanoverian succession in 1713, although France subsequently recognised James as "King of Scotland" during the 1745 rising. Even the Papacy withdrew its recognition of the Jacobite succession when James, the Old Pretender, died in 1766.

With the defeat at the Battle of Culloden in 1746, Jacobitism was dealt a death blow and the Jacobite succession lost its significance as a dynastic alternative to the Hanoverians. Jacobitism went into a rapid decline and with the death of Charles, the 'Young Pretender' in 1788, the Jacobite succession lost what was left of its political importance. His younger brother, Henry, Cardinal of York, died in 1807 and the Royal House of Stuart thereby became extinct. With the death of the last Stuart, the House of Hanover was completely established as the only credible dynasty for the British throne.

=== Line of succession after the Stuarts ===
Applying primogeniture, the notional rights to the Stuarts' claim then passed to Henry's nearest surviving relative, Charles Emmanuel IV of Sardinia, and from him on to other members of the House of Savoy, and then to the Houses of Austria-Este and Wittelsbach over the subsequent two centuries. Neither Charles Emmanuel nor any of the subsequent heirs have ever put forward any claims to the British throne. Aside from the brief Neo-Jacobite Revival in the years before the First World War, and a handful of modern adherents, any support for the Jacobite succession had disappeared by the end of the 18th century after it had been abandoned by even the inner core of its supporters. Although there are a small number of modern-day self-described 'Jacobites', not all of them support the restoration of the Jacobite succession to the throne.

In his memoirs, Duke Franz of Bavaria, the current genealogical heir of the Jacobite claim, describes it as a "charming historical curiosity", which he had first heard about on a trip to Scotland, to which his parents, who had never mentioned it, had sent him during his later school years. In the Royal Stuart Society, a toast was raised to the ″King over the Water″ in honor of his father Albrecht, Duke of Bavaria, just as the Jacobites once did. Franz recounts: Charles, then Prince of Wales, "was often in Munich, and we were often teased about it. He responded with great wit." When Charles visited Franz at Nymphenburg Palace in 1987, reporters asked him about Franz's claim to the British throne. He jokingly replied that this claim was probably better than his own.

While Franz′ brother Max Emanuel is the heir presumptive of both the Bavarian and Jacobite claims to a royal throne, the two lines of succession will diverge after him. This is because, according to Salic law, the Bavarian claims to the throne are inherited exclusively through the male line, whereas under British succession law, the Jacobite claim also passes to female descendants. This means that after Max Emanuel, his eldest daughter Sophie, Hereditary Princess of Liechtenstein, would be the heir to this claim, followed by her eldest son, Prince Joseph Wenzel of Liechtenstein, who is second in line to the Liechtenstein throne after his father. He would not be the first Jacobite pretender to rule another country, but the first since the Old Pretender in 1688 to be born on British soil (1995 in London).

== Pretenders and subsequent heirs ==
English common law determined the line of succession based on male-preference primogeniture, and Scots law applied the same principle in relation to the crown of Scotland. Following the Glorious Revolution, this was altered by a series of English and Scottish statutes, namely the Claim of Right Act 1689, the Bill of Rights 1689 and the Act of Settlement 1701, but Jacobites did not accept their validity. The tables below set out the male-preference primogeniture line of succession, unaltered by those statutes.

=== Stuart pretenders ===
The Stuarts who claimed the thrones of England, Scotland, and Ireland as pretenders after 1688 were:

Claimant and dates of claim	Portrait	Basis of claim
James II & VII (1633–1701); 11 December 1688 (Note: The date given for the commencement of his claim is the date upon which James fled London. The English Parliament deemed that his flight constituted his abdication from the throne by a declaration made on 28 January 1689. With regard to the Scottish throne, however, James was not deposed until 4 April 1689, when the Scottish Convention of Estates declared that he had forfeited the crown. His Scottish deposition was not linked to his flight on 11 December 1688, but to his misdemeanours generally.) – 16 September 1701		James lawfully succeeded his brother, Charles II, to the throne on 6 February 1685, as Charles did not have any legitimate children. When James fled the country in 1688, the English Parliament declared that he had abdicated and, later, the Scottish Convention of Estates declared he had forfeited his crown by his misdemeanours. However, James and his supporters denied that he had abdicated and claimed that the declaration of forfeiture had been by an illegal Scottish Convention. They maintained that James continued to be the rightful king.
James Francis Edward Stuart (1688–1766) ("James III & VIII") ("The Old Pretender") ("The Chevalier de St. George"); 16 September 1701 – 1 January 1766	James	Upon James II & VII's death in 1701, James, called the Old Pretender by his detractors, as James II/VII's only surviving legitimate son, inherited his father's claim.
Charles Edward Stuart (1720–1788) ("Charles III") ("The Young Pretender") ("Bonnie Prince Charlie"); 1 January 1766 – 31 January 1788	Charles	Upon the death of James, the "Old Pretender", in 1766, Charles, as James's eldest son, assumed his claim to the throne.
Henry Benedict Stuart (1725–1807) ("Henry IX & I") ("Cardinal Duke of York"); 31 January 1788 – 13 July 1807	Henry	Upon Charles Edward Stuart's death in 1788, Henry, as Charles's only brother, was the only surviving son of James III/VIII and the last surviving legitimate descendant of James II/VII. However, as a Catholic priest and archbishop, he could not marry or have legitimate offspring.

=== Subsequent succession ===
Upon the extinction of the royal Stuart line with the death of Henry, Cardinal Duke of York, and applying male-preference primogeniture unaltered by the Act of Settlement 1701, the succession would have passed to the individuals named in the table below. However, unlike the Stuart pretenders, none of them has publicly claimed the thrones of England, Scotland or Ireland, or incorporated the arms of these countries in their coats-of-arms. Nevertheless, since the 19th century, there have been small groups advocating the restoration of the Jacobite succession to the throne.

Descendant and dates as heir-general of the Stuart pretenders (Note: That is, heir of the Stuart pretenders based on male-preference primogeniture. The dates given are the dates of the death of the individual's predecessor in the line of succession and their own death.)	Portrait	Relationship to predecessor in line of succession (primogeniture)	House
Charles Emmanuel IV of Sardinia; Carlo Emanuale IV di Savoia (1751–1819) ("Charles IV"); 13 July 1807 – 6 October 1819	Charles Emmanuel IV	Senior surviving descendant of Henry Cardinal of York's great aunt, Henrietta of Orleans. She was a daughter of Charles I and sister of James II and VII. When Henry died childless and no other legitimate descendants of James II/VII survived him, the only surviving legitimate descendants of any of James's siblings were those of Henrietta. Her daughter Anne Marie d'Orléans had a son who became Duke of Savoy and King of Sardinia as Charles Emmanuel III; his only child with issue was his son, Victor Amadeus III; and his eldest son was Charles Emmanuel IV, who was thus a great-great-great-grandson of Charles I. Simplified: Charles I → Henrietta → Anne Marie → Charles Emmanuel III → Victor Amadeus → Jacobite King Charles IV Emmanuel	Savoy
Victor Emmanuel I of Sardinia; Vittorio Emanuale I di Savoia (1759–1824) ("Victor"); 6 October 1819 – 10 January 1824	Victor Emmanuel I	Next eldest brother of his predecessor, Charles Emmanuel, who died childless.	Savoy
Maria Beatrice of Savoy (1792–1840) ("Mary II" or "Mary III") (Note: Terry (1901) numbers Mary, Queen of Scots, as Mary II (considering her the rightful queen of England and Ireland after Mary I Tudor) whereas Petrie (1950) does not.); 10 January 1824 – 15 September 1840		Eldest surviving daughter of her predecessor, Victor Emmanuel, who had no surviving sons.	Savoy
Francis V, Duke of Modena; Francesco V d'Austria-Este (1819–1875) ("Francis I"); 15 September 1840 – 20 November 1875		Eldest son of his predecessor, Maria Beatrice.	Austria-Este
Maria Theresa of Austria-Este (1849–1919) ("Mary III" or "Mary IV"); 20 November 1875 – 3 February 1919		Niece of her predecessor, Francis, who died without surviving children. She was the only child of Francis's only brother, Ferdinand, who had pre-deceased Francis.	Austria-Este
Rupprecht, Crown Prince of Bavaria (1869–1955) ("Robert I & IV" or "Rupert I"); 3 February 1919 – 2 August 1955		Eldest son of his predecessor, Maria Theresa.	Wittelsbach
Albrecht, Duke of Bavaria (1905–1996) ("Albert"); 2 August 1955 – 8 July 1996		Eldest surviving son of his predecessor, Rupprecht.	Wittelsbach
Franz von Bayern (born 1933) ("Francis II"); 8 July 1996 – present		Eldest son of his predecessor, Albrecht.	Wittelsbach

== Family tree ==
Family tree showing the Jacobite line of succession and its relationship to the UK monarchs descended from Sophia of Hanover

The Jacobite and Hanoverian/Windsor successions

James VI and I
Charles I	Elizabeth
Charles II	James VII and II	Mary	Henrietta	Sophia
James VIII and III	Mary II	Anne	William III	Anne Marie	George I
Charles III	Henry I and IX	Charles Emmanuel	George II
Victor Amadeus	Frederick
Charles IV	Victor	George III
Mary II or III	George IV	William IV	Edward
Francis I	Ferdinand	Victoria
Mary III or IV	Edward VII
Robert I and IV	George V
Albert	Edward VIII	George VI
Francis II	Max	Elizabeth II
Sophie	Charles III
Joseph Wenzel	William
George

== See also ==
- Alternative successions to the English and British Crown
- Jacobite consorts
