= Princess Marie Caroline of Liechtenstein =

Liechtenstein princess (born 1996)

Princess Marie Caroline
- Countess of Rietberg
- Born: 17 October 1996 (age 30); Grabs, Switzerland
- Spouse: Leopoldo Maduro Vollmer (m. 2025)
Names
- Marie Caroline Elisabeth Immaculata Liechtenstein
- House: Liechtenstein
- Father: Alois, Hereditary Prince of Liechtenstein
- Mother: Duchess Sophie in Bavaria

Princess Marie Caroline of Liechtenstein, Countess of Rietberg (Marie Caroline Elisabeth Immaculata; born 17 October 1996) is a member of the Princely family of Liechtenstein. She is the second child and only daughter of Alois, Hereditary Prince of Liechtenstein and a granddaughter of Hans-Adam II.

== Early life and education ==
Princess Marie Caroline was born at Grabs Hospital in Grabs, Switzerland on 17 October 1996 as the second child and only daughter of Alois, Hereditary Prince of Liechtenstein and Duchess Sophie in Bavaria. She is the granddaughter of Hans-Adam II, Prince of Liechtenstein.

She attended Ebenholz Primary School in Vaduz and the Swiss International School in the Rheintal. Marie Caroline then boarded at Malvern College in England. She graduated from Parsons School of Design in 2020 with a degree in fashion design.

== Adult life ==
Marie Caroline lives in London, where she works in the textile industry.

In October 2024, the Princely family of Liechtenstein announced Marie Caroline's engagement to British-based Venezuelan investment banker Leopoldo Maduro Vollmer.

On 30 August 2025, she married Leopoldo Maduro Vollmer at the Cathedral of St. Florin in Vaduz. The mass was celebrated by Bishop Benno Elbs, the Apostolic Administrator of the Archdiocese of Vaduz. Marie Caroline wore the Habsburg fringe tiara for the wedding. The wedding was attended by members of the Liechtenstein princely family as well as Liechtenstein Prime Minister Brigitte Haas; Manfred Kaufmann, President of the Landtag of Liechtenstein; Princess Victoria, 20th Duchess of Medinaceli; Prince Jaime, Duke of Noto; and Prince Sébastien of Luxembourg. Their reception was held at Vaduz Castle.
