= Max Emanuel Herzog in Bayern =

Max Emanuel in Bayern
- Duke in Bavaria
- Born: 21 January 1937 (age 89); Munich, Germany
- Spouse: Countess Elisabeth Douglas (m. 1967; died 2026)
- Issue: Sophie, Hereditary Princess of Liechtenstein; Duchess Marie-Caroline; Duchess Helena Eugenie; Duchess Elizabeth Marie; Duchess Maria Anna, Baroness of Maltzan
Names
- Max Emanuel Ludwig Maria Herzog in Bayern
- House: Wittelsbach
- Father: Albrecht, Duke of Bavaria
- Mother: Countess Maria Draskovich von Trakostjan
- Religion: Roman Catholic

Max Emanuel Ludwig Maria Herzog in Bayern (sometimes styled Prince Max of Bavaria, Duke in Bavaria; born 21 January 1937) is the younger son of Albrecht, Duke of Bavaria and his first wife Countess Maria Draskovich of Trakostjan. He is the heir presumptive to both the headship of the former Bavarian royal house and the Jacobite succession.

== Life as an heir presumptive ==
He was born a Prince of Bavaria, as a member of the royal line of the House of Wittelsbach, whose head is his elder brother Franz, Duke of Bavaria. Max Emanuel is considered the next in line of succession to the headship of the former ruling dynasty, followed by his and Franz's first cousin Luitpold.

He has been using the title of Herzog in Bayern (Duke in Bavaria) since he was adopted as an adult by his grand-uncle, Duke Ludwig Wilhelm in Bavaria, the last bearer of that title of a junior branch of the House of Wittelsbach, from whom he inherited considerable estates at Tegernsee Abbey (including a brewery), Banz Abbey and the spa of Kreuth.

Since the Wittelsbach dynasty was opposed to the Nazi regime in Germany, his parents had emigrated in 1939 from Kreuth, Bavaria, to Budapest, Hungary. The family was arrested by the Gestapo in 1944, and 7-year old Max, along with his parents and siblings, was deported to the concentration camps of Sachsenhausen, Flossenbürg and Dachau. Badly hit by hunger and disease, the family barely survived.

After the war, Max attended the humanistic high school of Ettal Abbey and, like his elder brother, studied business administration at the universities of Munich and Zurich. He completed a banking apprenticeship in Switzerland before working in the administration of the House of Wittelsbach and of the Wittelsbach Compensation Fund (WAF). In addition to managing his agricultural and forestry operations, he then devoted himself primarily to the expansion of the Ducal Bavarian Brewery of Tegernsee, now managed by his youngest daughter Maria Anna. He was a member in the advisory board of a foundation running the Augustiner-Bräu brewery in Munich.

He has since taken over some honorary positions from his elder brother and is now a member of the board of trustees of LMU Munich and a member of the Bavarian advisory board of the Malteser Hilfsdienst, a charitable organization of the Sovereign Military Order of Malta that runs hospitals. He also took over the chairmanship of the board of trustees of the European Foundation for the Imperial Cathedral of Speyer in the State of Rhineland-Palatinate, through which the House of Wittelsbach still maintains a connection to one of its former main territories, the Electoral Palatinate.

== Marriage and issue ==
Max married the Swedish Countess Elisabeth Douglas (31 December 1940 – 21 November 2026), born in Stockholm and deceased at Schloss Wildenwart in Bavaria, daughter of Count Carl Ludvig Douglas (Swedish Ambassador to Brazil) and Ottora Maria Haas-Heye (a daughter of Otto Ludwig Haas-Heye and Countess Victoria zu Eulenburg), and sister of Count Gustaf Douglas, in a civil ceremony in Kreuth on 10 January 1967 and in a religious ceremony in Munich on 24 January 1967. His wife was also a granddaughter of Lieutenant General Count Archibald Douglas and a great-granddaughter of Philipp, Prince of Eulenburg.

They had five daughters:

- Duchess Sophie Elizabeth Marie Gabrielle in Bavaria (born 28 October 1967 in Munich), married on 3 July 1993 in Vaduz, Alois, Hereditary Prince of Liechtenstein (born 11 June 1968 in Zürich), son of Hans-Adam II, Prince of Liechtenstein, and Countess Marie Kinsky of Wchinitz and Tettau. They have four children. She took over her father's lands in Banz.
- Duchess Marie-Caroline Hedwig Eleonore in Bavaria (born 23 June 1969 in Munich), married on 27 July 1991 in Tegernsee, Duke Philipp of Württemberg (born 1 November 1964 in Friedrichshafen), son of Carl, Duke of Württemberg, and Princess Diane of Orléans. They have four children. Duke Philipp is an art historian and former Chairman of Sotheby's Europe. Duchess Marie-Caroline of Württemberg has been chair of the Board of Trustees of the Baden-Württemberg Foundation for Preventive Youth Welfare since 2011.
- Duchess Helena Eugenie Maria Donatha Mechthild in Bavaria (born 6 May 1972 in Munich). She took over the spa in Kreuth.
- Duchess Elisabeth Marie Christine Franziska in Bavaria (born 4 October 1973 in Munich), married on 25 September 2004 in Munich, Daniel Terberger (born 11 June 1967 in Bielefeld), CEO of German textile company KATAG AG. They have two children.
- Duchess Maria Anna Henriette Gabrielle Julie in Bavaria (born 7 May 1975 in Munich), firstly married on 8 September 2007 in Munich, Klaus Runow (born 3 July 1964 in Duisburg), an investment banker. Their divorce was announced in early 2015. Maria-Anna secondly married on 16 October 2015, Baron Andreas von Maltzahn. She has two sons from her first marriage. She now runs the Tegernsee brewery.

Max and Elisabeth initially raised their daughters in Kreuth. In 1979, they moved to Schloss Wildenwart near Frasdorf after Princess Helmtrud of Bavaria, a daughter of the late King Ludwig III, died there in 1977. The royal couple had lived in this private residence after the revolution, and Queen Maria Theresa had died there in 1919.

== Honours ==
- Recipient of the 70th Birthday Badge Medal of King Carl XVI Gustaf (30 April 2016)

== Gallery ==
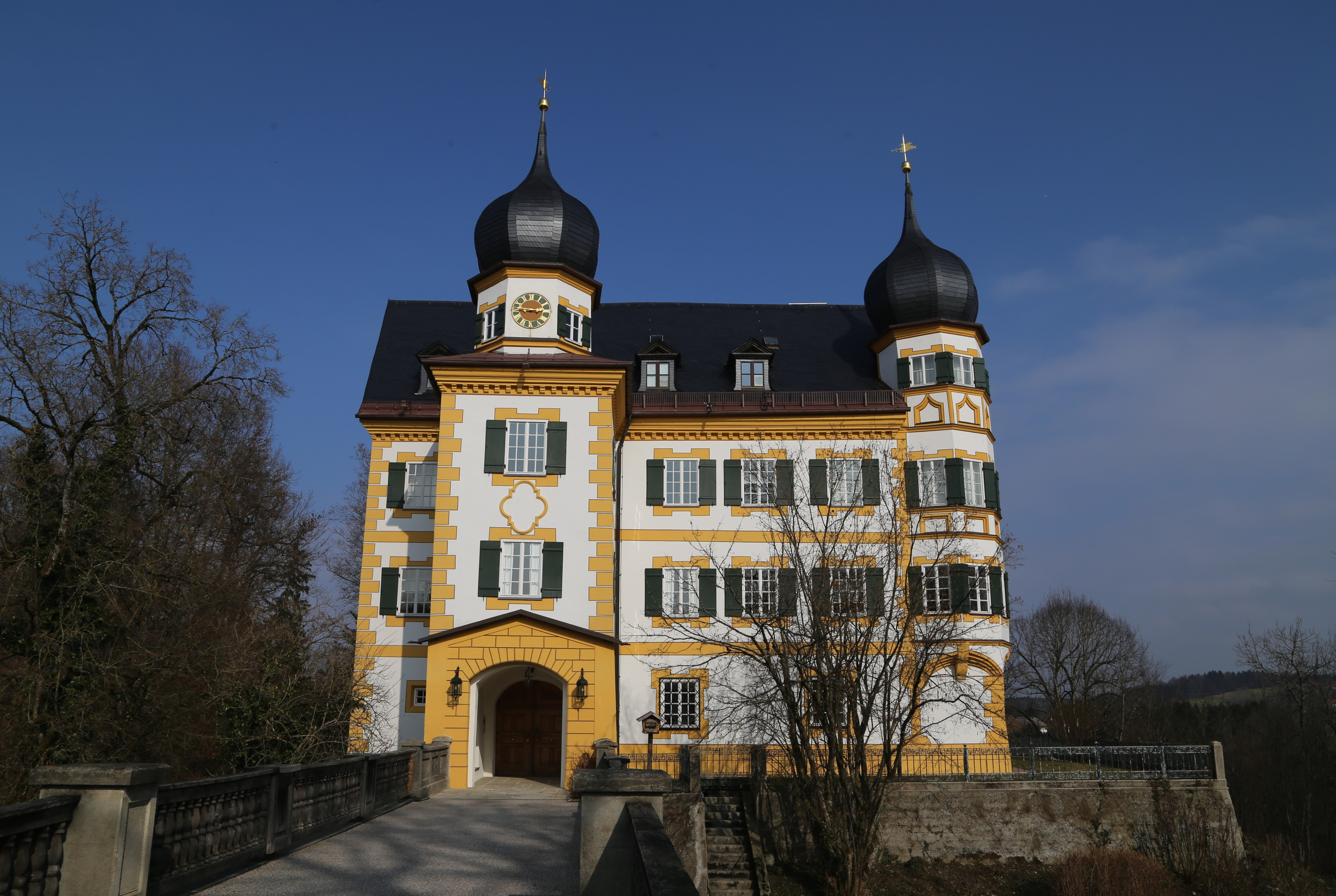
Schloss Wildenwart

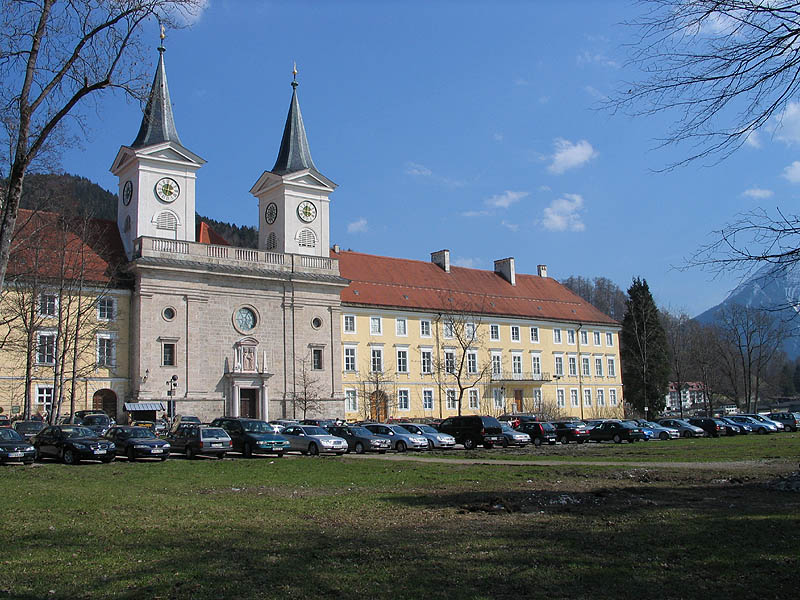
Tegernsee Abbey

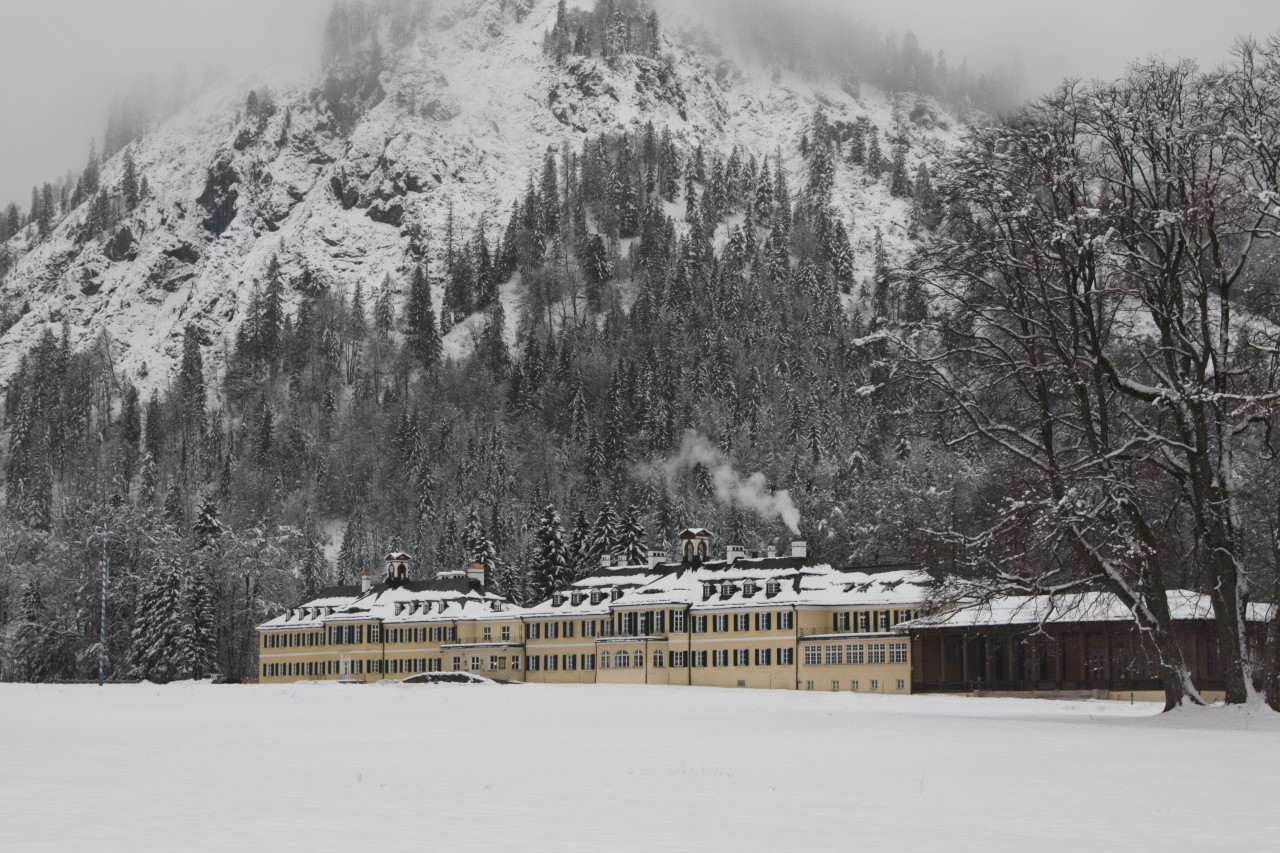
The bath house (Wildbad), Kreuth

Max Emanuel Herzog in Bayern House of Wittelsbach Born: 21 January 1937
Titles in pretence
| First | — TITULAR — Line of succession to the Bavarian throne | Succeeded by Prince Luitpold of Bavaria |
| First | — TITULAR — Jacobite succession | Succeeded by The Hereditary Princess of Liechtenstein |
