= List of princesses consort of Liechtenstein =

This is a list of princesses consort of Liechtenstein, wives of the reigning prince of Liechtenstein. As of 2026, there has never been a female monarch since all monarchs were required by law to be male up until the adoption of absolute primogeniture.

== Princess consort of Liechtenstein ==
Picture	Name	Arms	Father	Birth	Marriage	Became Princess	Ceased to be Princess	Death	Spouse
	Anna Maria Šemberová of Boskovice and Černá Hora		Johann Šembera of Černá Hora, Baron of Boskovice (Cernohorský von Boskowitz)	1575	1590	20 December 1608 husband's creation as sovereign prince	6 June 1625		Karl I
	Johanna Beatrix von Dietrichstein-Nikolsburg		Maximilian II, Prince von Dietrichstein-Nikolsburg (Dietrichstein-Nikolsburg)	1625	6 August 1644		26 March 1676		Karl Eusebius
	Erdmuthe Maria Theresia Maria von Dietrichstein-Nikolsburg		Ferdinand Josef, Prince von Dietrichstein-Nikolsburg (Dietrichstein-Nikolsburg)	17 April 1662	16 February 1681	5 April 1684 husband's accession	16 June 1712 husband's death	15 March 1737	Hans-Adam I
	Eleonore Barbara of Thun-Hohenstein		Count Michael Oswald of Thun-Hohenstein (Thun-Hohenstein)	4 May 1661	15 October 1679	12 March 1718 husband's accession	11 October 1721 husband's death	10 February 1723	Anton Florian
	Maria Anna of Oettingen-Spielberg		Francis Albert, I Prince of Oettingen-Spielberg (Oettingen-Spielberg)	21 September 1693	3 August 1716	11 October 1721 husband's accession	15 April 1729		Joseph Johann Adam
	Maria Anna Kottulinska von Kottulin		Count Franz Karl Kottulinsky, Baron von Kottulin und Krzizkowitz (Kottulinsky)	12 May 1707	22 August 1729		16 December 1732 husband's death	6 February 1788	Joseph Johann Adam
	Maria Josepha von Harrach-Rohrau		Count Friedrich August von Harrach-Rohrau (Harrach)	20 November 1727	19 March 1744		22 December 1748 husband's death	15 February 1788	Johann Nepomuk Karl
	Anna Maria of Liechtenstein		Anton Florian, Prince of Liechtenstein (Liechtenstein)	11 September 1699	19 April 1718	22 December 1748 husband's reaccession	20 January 1753		Joseph Wenzel I (3rd reign)
	Leopoldine von Sternberg		Count Franz Philipp von Sternberg (Sternberg)	11 December 1733	6 July 1750	10 February 1772 husband's accession	18 August 1781 husband's death	27 June 1809	Franz Joseph I
	Karoline von Manderscheid-Blankenheim		Count Johann Wilhelm von Manderscheid-Blankenheim (Manderscheid-Blankenheim)	14 November 1768	16 November 1783		24 March 1805 husband's death	11 June 1831	Aloys I
	Josepha of Fürstenberg-Weitra		Landgrave Joachim Egon of Fürstenberg-Weitra (Fürstenberg-Weitra)	21 June 1776	12 April 1792	24 March 1805 husband's accession	20 April 1836 husband's death	23 February 1848	Johann I Joseph
	Franziska Kinsky of Wchinitz and Tettau		Count Franz de Paula Kinsky von Wchinitz und Tettau (Kinsky)	8 August 1813	8 August 1831	20 April 1836 husband's accession	12 November 1858 husband's death	5 February 1881	Aloys II
	Elsa von Gutmann		Wilhelm Ritter von Gutmann (Gutmann)	8 January 1875	22 July 1929		25 July 1938 husband's death	28 September 1947	Franz I
	Gina von Wilczek		Count Ferdinand Maria of Wilczek (Wilczek)	24 October 1921	7 March 1943		18 October 1989		Franz Joseph II
	Marie Kinsky of Wchinitz and Tettau		Count Ferdinand Carl Kinsky von Wchinitz und Tettau (Kinsky)	14 April 1940	30 July 1967	13 November 1989 husband's accession	21 August 2021		Hans-Adam II

== See also ==
- House of Liechtenstein
- Prince of Liechtenstein
