= List of monarchs of Liechtenstein =

There have been 16 monarchs of the Principality of Liechtenstein since 1608. The current Prince of Liechtenstein is Hans-Adam II, since 13 November 1989. The current Hereditary Prince and Regent of Liechtenstein is Alois, since 15 August 2004.

== Monarchs of Liechtenstein ==
Name	Lifespan	Reign start	Reign end	Notes	Family	Image
Karl I	30 July 1569 – 12 February 1627 (aged 57)	20 December 1608	12 February 1627 (18 years, 54 days)	Son of Hartmann II	Liechtenstein	Karl I of Liechtenstein
Karl Eusebius	11 April 1611 – 5 April 1684 (aged 72)	12 February 1627	5 April 1684 (57 years, 53 days)	Son of Karl I	Liechtenstein	Karl Eusebius of Liechtenstein
Hans-Adam I	16 August 1662 – 16 June 1712 (aged 49)	5 April 1684	16 June 1712 (28 years, 72 days)	Son of Karl Eusebius	Liechtenstein	Hans-Adam I of Liechtenstein
Joseph Wenzel I (1st reign)	9 August 1696 – 10 February 1772 (aged 75)	16 June 1712	12 March 1718 (5 years, 269 days)	Great-grandnephew of Karl I	Liechtenstein	Joseph Wenzel I of Liechtenstein
Anton Florian	28 May 1656 – 11 October 1721 (aged 65)	12 March 1718	11 October 1721 (3 years, 213 days)	Uncle of Joseph Wenzel I	Liechtenstein	Anton Florian of Liechtenstein
Joseph Johann Adam	25 May 1690 – 17 December 1732 (aged 42)	11 October 1721	17 December 1732 (11 years, 67 days)	Son of Anton Florian	Liechtenstein	Joseph Johann Adam of Liechtenstein
Johann Nepomuk Karl	6 July 1724 – 22 December 1748 (aged 24)	17 December 1732	22 December 1748 (16 years, 5 days)	Son of Joseph Johann Adam	Liechtenstein	Johann Nepomuk Karl of Liechtenstein
Joseph Wenzel I (2nd reign)	9 August 1696 – 10 February 1772 (aged 75)	22 December 1748	10 February 1772 (23 years, 50 days)	Great-grandnephew of Karl I	Liechtenstein	Joseph Wenzel I of Liechtenstein
Franz Joseph I	19 November 1726 – 18 August 1781 (aged 54)	10 February 1772	18 August 1781 (9 years, 189 days)	Nephew of Joseph Wenzel I	Liechtenstein	Franz Joseph I of Liechtenstein
Aloys I	14 May 1759 – 24 March 1805 (aged 45)	18 August 1781	24 March 1805 (23 years, 218 days)	Son of Franz Joseph I	Liechtenstein	Aloys I of Liechtenstein
Johann I Joseph	26 June 1760 – 20 April 1836 (aged 75)	24 March 1805	20 April 1836 (31 years, 27 days)	Son of Franz Joseph I	Liechtenstein	Johann I Josef of Liechtenstein
Aloys II	26 May 1796 – 12 November 1858 (aged 62)	20 April 1836	12 November 1858 (22 years, 206 days)	Son of Johann I Joseph	Liechtenstein	Aloys II of Liechtenstein
Johann II	5 October 1840 – 11 February 1929 (aged 88)	12 November 1858	11 February 1929 (70 years, 91 days)	Son of Aloys II	Liechtenstein	Johann II of Liechtenstein
Franz I	28 August 1853 – 25 July 1938 (aged 84)	11 February 1929	25 July 1938 (9 years, 164 days)	Son of Aloys II	Liechtenstein	Franz I of Liechtenstein
Franz Joseph II	16 August 1906 – 13 November 1989 (aged 83)	25 July 1938	13 November 1989 (51 years, 111 days)	Grand-nephew of Franz I	Liechtenstein	Franz Joseph II of Liechtenstein
Hans-Adam II	14 February 1945 (age 81)	13 November 1989	Incumbent (36 years, 358 days)	Son of Franz Joseph II	Liechtenstein	Hans-Adam II of Liechtenstein

== Family tree ==
The names in bold signify official reigning monarchs of Liechtenstein.

Hartmann II
**Karl I**	Gundakar	Maximilian
**Karl Eusebius**	Hartmann III
**Hans-Adam I**	**Anton Florian**	Philipp Erasmus
**Josef Johann Adam**	Anna Maria	**Josef Wenzel I**	Emanuel
**Johann Nepomuk Karl**	**Franz Josef I**	Karl Borromäus
**Aloys I**	**Johann I Joseph**	Joseph Wenzel Franz
**Aloys II**	Franz de Paula	Eduard Franz
**Johann II**	**Franz I**	Henriette	Alfred	Louis	Aloys
Aloys	Johann	Alfred Roman	Karl Aloys	Friedrich
**Franz Josef II**	Karl Alfred	Emanuel	Constantin	Heinrich Karl	Alfred Joseph
**Hans-Adam II**	Philipp	Nikolaus	Vincenz	Alexander
Alois	Maximilian	Wenzeslaus	Stefen
Joseph Wenzel

== See also ==
- Monarchy of Liechtenstein
- List of princesses consort of Liechtenstein
- Succession to the Liechtensteiner throne
- House of Liechtenstein
- Ducal hat of Liechtenstein
- 2008 Liechtenstein tax affair
