= Joseph Wenzel I of Liechtenstein =

Prince of Liechtenstein (r. 1712–1718, 1748–1772)

Joseph Wenzel I
- Duke of Troppau and Jägerndorf
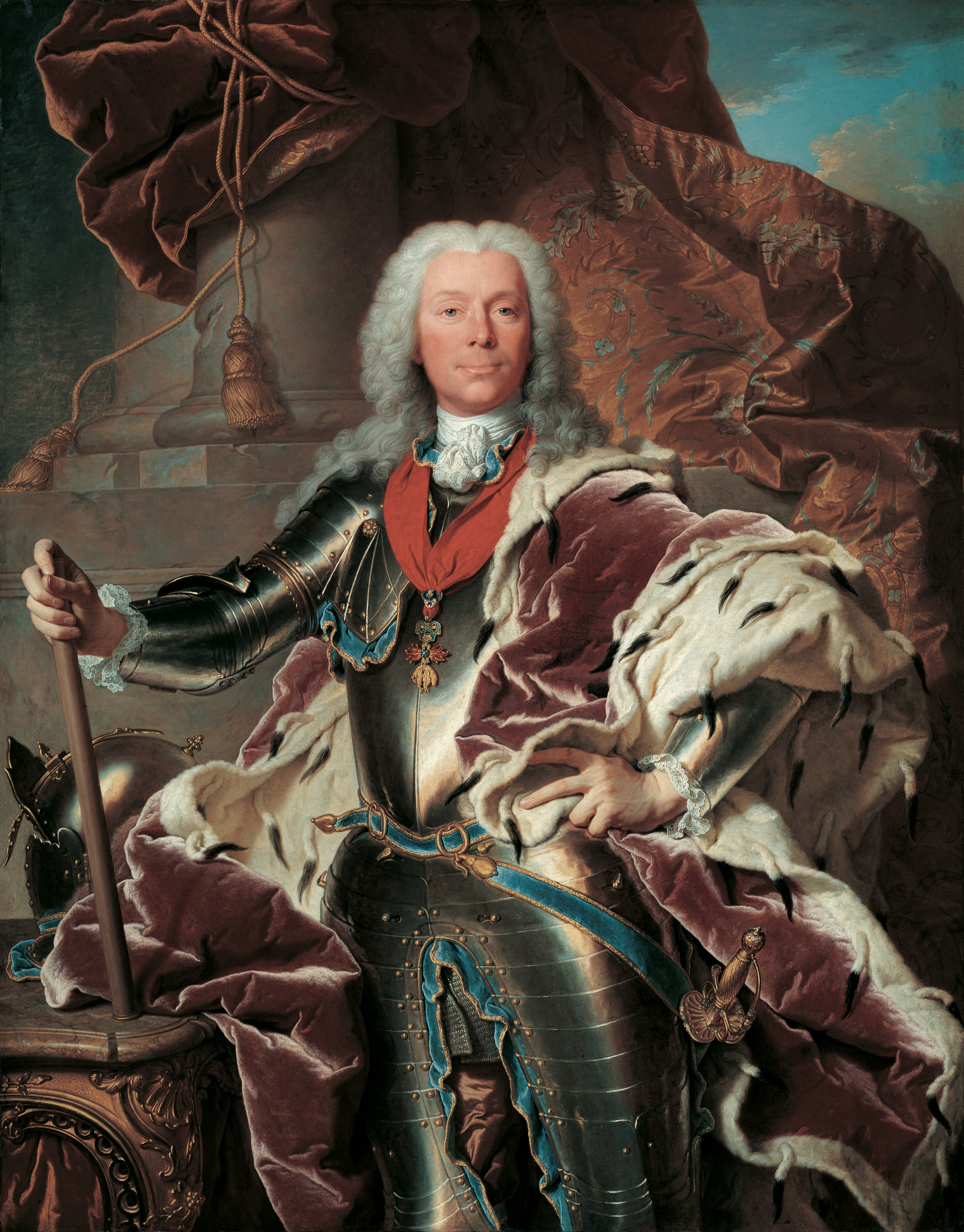
- 1740 portrait by Hyacinthe Rigaud

Prince of Liechtenstein
- Reign: 16 June 1712 – 12 March 1718
- Predecessor: Hans-Adam I
- Successor: Anton Florian
- Reign: 22 December 1748 – 10 February 1772
- Predecessor: Johann Nepomuk Karl
- Successor: Franz Josef I
- Born: 9 August 1696; Prague, Kingdom of Bohemia
- Died: 10 February 1772 (aged 75); Vienna, Archduchy of Austria
- Burial: Church of the Nativity of the Virgin Mary, Brno
- Spouse: Princess Anna Maria Antonie of Liechtenstein (m. 1718; died 1753)
- Issue: Prince Philipp Anton; Prince Philipp Anton; Prince Philipp Ernst; Princess Maria Elisabeth; Princess Marie Alexandra
Names
- Josef Wenzel Lorenz
- House: Liechtenstein
- Father: Prince Philipp Erasmus of Liechtenstein
- Mother: Christina Theresa von Löwenstein-Wertheim-Rochefort
- Religion: Catholic

Josef Wenzel I (Josef Wenzel Lorenz; 9 August 1696 – 10 February 1772), often referred to as just Wenzel, was the Prince of Liechtenstein between 1712 and 1718, and 1748 and 1772, as well as regent of Liechtenstein between 1732 and 1745. He first succeeded his distant cousin Hans-Adam I, even though he was not next in line. The actual heir was his uncle Anton Florian, who was not very popular among the family. Therefore, Hans-Adam chose Josef Wenzel as his heir. He later decided to hand over the Principality in exchange for his getting the Dominion of Rumburk in 1718. 30 years later, he inherited Liechtenstein again after his nephew Prince Johann Nepomuk Karl died without male issue. As a military figure, Wenzel is known for his command of the Austrians at the Battle of Piacenza (War of the Austrian Succession) and also for the reorganization of the Austrian artillery with the new "Liechtenstein artillery system".

== Biography ==
Born in 1696 at Prague, Josef Wenzel was the eldest son of Prince Philipp Erasmus of Liechtenstein (11 September 1664 – 13 January 1704) and Countess Christina Theresa von Löwenstein-Wertheim-Rochefort (12 October 1665 – 14 April 1730). He was a great-grandnephew of Karl, the first Prince of Liechtenstein. In 1712, he succeeded his distant cousin Hans-Adam I, as the Prince of Liechtenstein, even though he was not next in line. The actual heir was his uncle Anton Florian, who was not very popular among the family. Hans-Adam therefore chose Josef Wenzel as his heir, but in 1718 the latter negotiated with Anton Florian and swapped the County of Vaduz and the Lordship of Schellenberg in exchange for the Dominion of Rumburk. He also married Anton Florian's daughter Anna Maria Antonie, who was Wenzel's cousin. A year later the two dominions were united into the new Principality of Liechtenstein, headed by Anton Florian. Joseph Wenzel then enjoyed a long life of military successes. He was primarily a general and was a very successful campaigner. His first venture was in 1717, when he fought against the Ottoman Turks in the Austro-Turkish War, alongside famed military commander Prince Eugene of Savoy.

In 1725, Joseph Wenzel became inhaber (proprietor) of Dragoon Regiment Nr. 2, succeeding the previous inhaber, Johann Peter von Saint-Amour. He would remain proprietor until his death in 1772. The next inhaber was his nephew Franz Joseph I, Prince of Liechtenstein. On 27 November 1733, Joseph Wenzel was promoted Generalfeldwachtmeister and on 30 May 1734, he was elevated in rank to Feldmarschall-Leutnant. Promotion to General of the Cavalry occurred on 2 March 1739 and promotion to Field Marshal came on 12 May 1745.

In 1733, Joseph Wenzel participated in the War of the Polish Succession, once again alongside Prince Eugene. In 1745, he was made Generalissimo in Italy and was victorious the following year at the Battle of Piacenza. In 1753 he was made General Chief Commander in Hungary. In one of the greatest achievements of his career, he reorganised the Habsburg artillery, partially financed out of his own pocket. He was the 698th Knight of the Order of the Golden Fleece in Austria. From 1735 to 1736, he was Imperial Envoy to Berlin and he was Imperial Ambassador to Paris between 1738 and 1741. In 1760, he escorted the future bride of Josef II to Vienna.

Joseph Wenzel was appointed Director General of Austrian artillery in 1744. During the War of the Austrian Succession, the Austrian artillery performed poorly compared to the Prussian artillery. Joseph Wenzel initiated a series of reforms in 1753 that resulted in the Liechtenstein artillery system. Guns and gun carriages were made lighter. The previous system which amounted to an artillery guild was abolished and the gunners were reorganized and educated in the latest methods. The field artillery was reduced to 3-pounder, 6-pounder, and 12-pounder cannons, and 1-pounder and 7-pounder howitzers. The heavy artillery was limited to 12-pounder, 18-pounder, and 24-pounder siege guns. Mortars were 10-, 30-, 60-, and 100-pounders. Gun carriages were redesigned so that their parts were interchangeable. The Austrian artillery became the best in Europe in the Seven Years' War, to the dismay of their Prussian opponents.

In 1732, Prince Josef Johann Adam, son and heir of the aforesaid Anton Florian, died and was succeeded by his son Johann Nepomuk Karl. However, the new Prince was only eight years old at the time, so Wenzel was established as his regent and guardian until he came of age in 1745. Johann Nepomuk did not live long however, dying only three years later in 1748. With no surviving male issue, the Principality passed back to Wenzel. He then went on to rule Liechtenstein until his death in 1772. With no surviving issue, Liechtenstein went to his nephew Franz Josef I.

== Marriage and issue ==
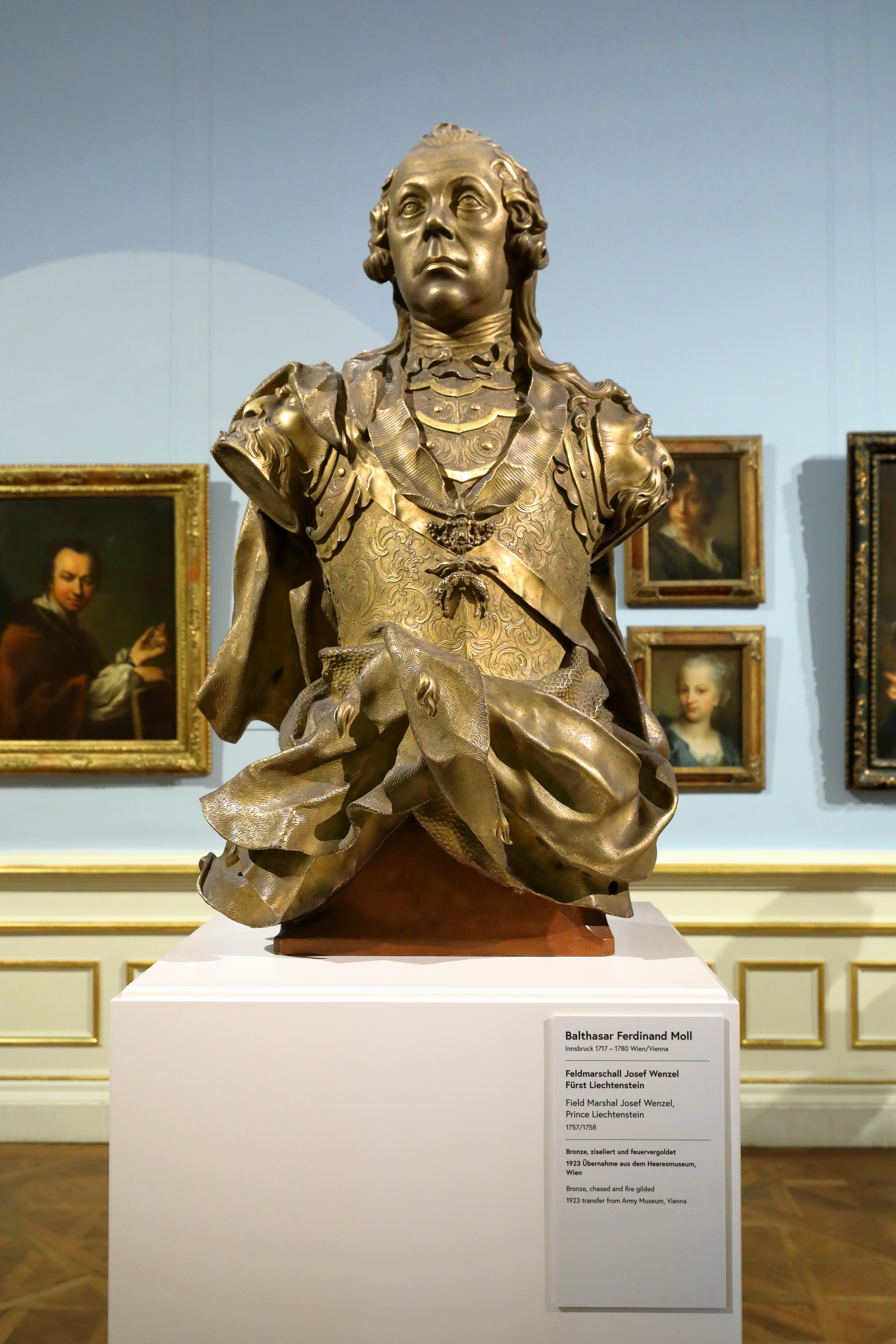
Bust of Prince Josef Wenzel in the Upper Belvedere in Vienna

On 19 April 1718 Josef Wenzel married his cousin, Princess Anna Maria Antonie of Liechtenstein (1699–1753), daughter of Anton Florian and Eleonore Barbara von Thun und Hohenstein, in 1718. They had five children, all of whom died in early childhood:

- Prince Philipp Anton (1 June 1719) died in infancy.
- Prince Philipp Anton (1720) died in infancy.
- Prince Philipp Ernst (5 June 1722 – 26 December 1723) died in early childhood
- Princess Maria Elisabeth (3 May 1724) died in infancy
- Princess Marie Alexandra (9 May 1727) died in infancy

== Footnotes ==
Joseph Wenzel I of Liechtenstein House of Liechtenstein Born: 9 August 1696 Died: 10 February 1772
Regnal titles
Preceded by Hans-Adam I	Prince of Liechtenstein; 1712–1718	Succeeded by Anton Florian
Preceded by Johann Nepomuk Karl	Prince of Liechtenstein; 1748–1772	Succeeded by Franz Josef I
Military offices
Preceded by Johann Peter von Saint-Amour	Proprietor (Inhaber) of Dragoon Regiment Nr. 2; 1725–1772	Succeeded by Johann von Liechtenstein
