= Eleonore Barbara von Thun und Hohenstein =

Princess of Liechtenstein from 1718 to 1721

Eleonore Barbara
- Duchess of Troppau and Jägerndorf
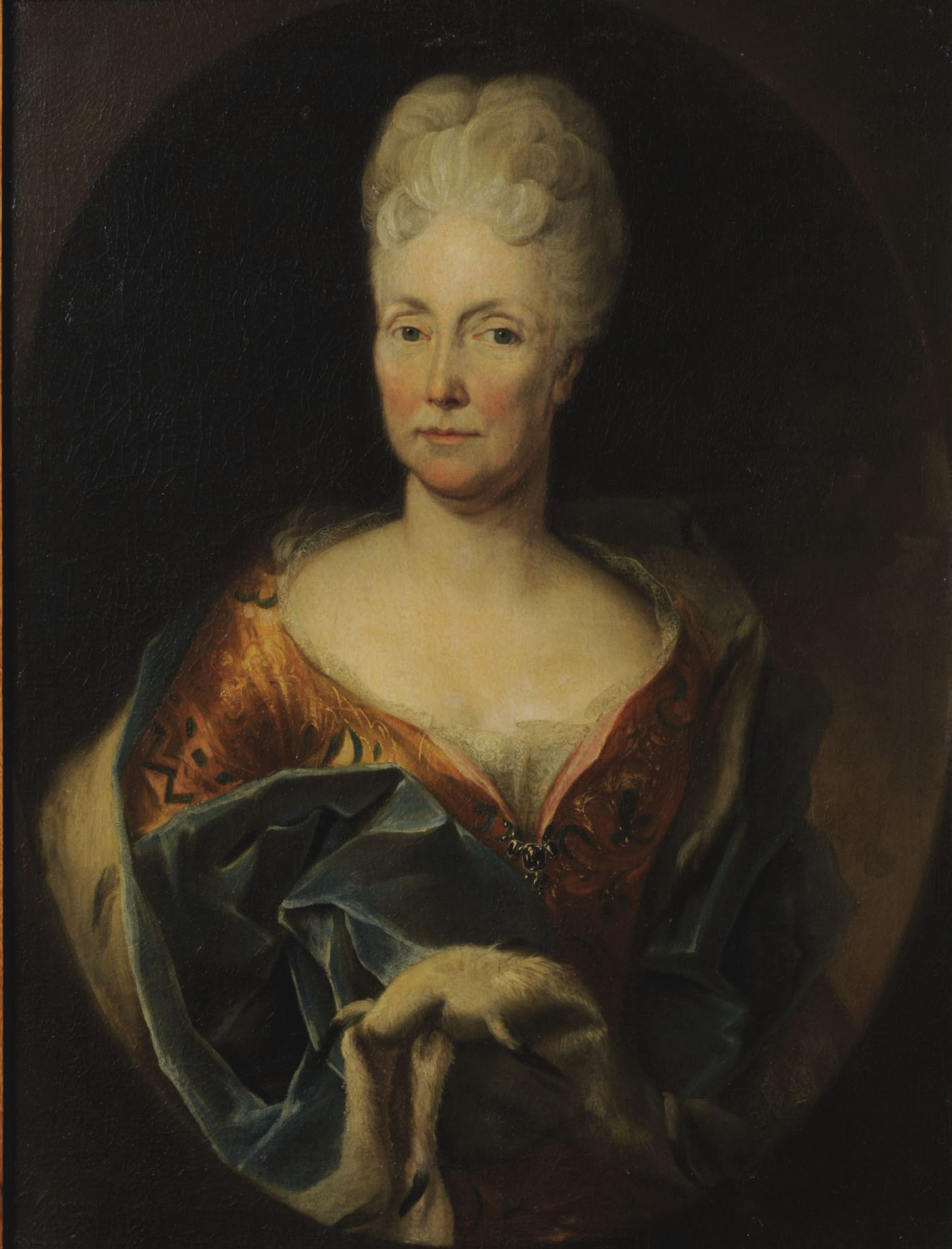

Princess consort of Liechtenstein
- Tenure: 12 March 1718 – 11 October 1721
- Born: 4 May 1661; Prague, Kingdom of Bohemia; Holy Roman Empire
- Died: 10 February 1723 (aged 61); Vienna, Archduchy of Austria; Holy Roman Empire
- Burial: Paulanerkirche, Vienna
- Spouse: Anton Florian, Prince of Liechtenstein (m. 1679; died 1721)
- Issue: Joseph Johann Adam, Prince of Liechtenstein; Princess Anna Maria
- House: Thun und Hohenstein
- Father: Count Michael Oswald von Thun und Hohenstein
- Mother: Countess Elisabeth von Lodron

Countess Eleonore Barbara Catharina von Thun und Hohenstein (4 May 1661 – 10 February 1723) was an Austrian noblewoman who, as the wife of Anton Florian, Prince of Liechtenstein, was the Princess of Liechtenstein from 1718 to 1721. She accompanied her husband on diplomatic missions to Rome and Barcelona. After her husband's death in 1721, she spent the remaining two years of her life in Vienna. Her husband was succeeded by their son, Prince Joseph Johann Adam. Eleonore's daughter, Princess Anna Maria, later became Princess consort of Liechtenstein as the wife of Joseph Wenzel I.

== Early life and family ==
Eleonore was born on 4 May 1661 in Prague to Count Michael Oswald von Thun und Hohenstein (1631-1694) and his first wife, Countess Elisabeth von Lodron (1635–1688).

Her father was an Imperial chamberlain and advisor. Through her mother, she was related to Count Paris von Lodron, Prince-Archbishop of Salzburg. Eleonore, by birth, was a member of both the Austrian and German-Bohemian nobility.

== Marriage and issue ==
On 15 October 1679, Countess Eleonore married Prince Anton Florian of Liechtenstein in Graupen, Kingdom of Bohemia.

They had eleven children:

- Prince Franz Augustin (1680–1681)
- Princess Eleonore (1681–1682)
- Princess Antonia Maria Eleonore (12 January 1683 – 19 December 1715)
- Prince Karl Joseph Florian (b. and d. 1685)
- Prince Anton Ignaz Joseph (1689–1690)
- Joseph Johann Adam, Prince of Liechtenstein (27 May 1690 – 17 December 1732)
- Prince Innozenz Franz Anton (1693–1707)
- Princess Maria Karoline Anna (23 August 1694 – 16 April 1735)
- Prince Karl Joseph (1697–1704)
- Princess Anna Maria Antonie (1699–1753); married her cousin, Joseph Wenzel I, Prince of Liechtenstein
- Princess Maria Eleonore (1703 – 18 July 1757); married Count Friedrich August von Harrach-Rohrau-Thannhausen

== Princess of Liechtenstein ==
On 12 March 1718 her husband ascended the throne as the reigning Prince of Liechtenstein, thus making her the Princess Consort.

She accompanied her husband on his diplomatic and political missions throughout the Holy Roman Empire and Western Europe, including in Rome and Barcelona. While staying in Rome, Arsenio di San Antonio dedicated his Catholic devotional book, Stimulo di divotione verso la santissima Vergine e suo sacro scapolare, to Eleonore. In Spain, she accompanied her husband while he served as the Chief Intendant and Prime Minister of Archduke Karl of Austria, during the War of Spanish Succession.

== Death ==
Eleonore's husband died in 1721. She died two years later, on 10 February 1723, in Vienna. She was buried in the crypt of the Paulanerkirche in Vienna instead of the family crypt of the House of Liechtenstein at the Church of the Nativity of the Virgin Mary in Vranov.
