= Leopold, Count von Thun und Hohenstein =

Austrian statesman (1811–1888)

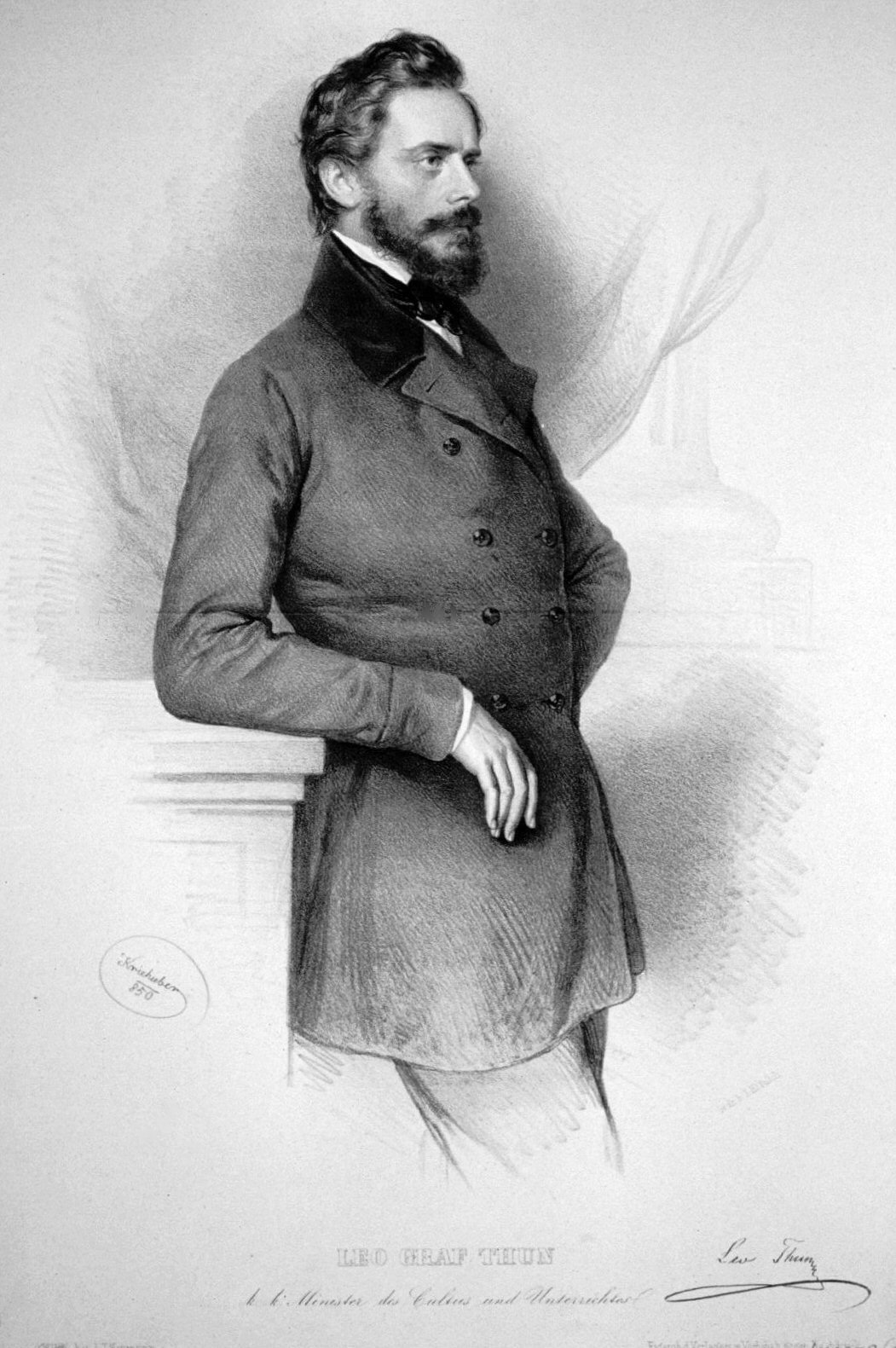
Leopold, Graf von Thun und Hohenstein, 1850

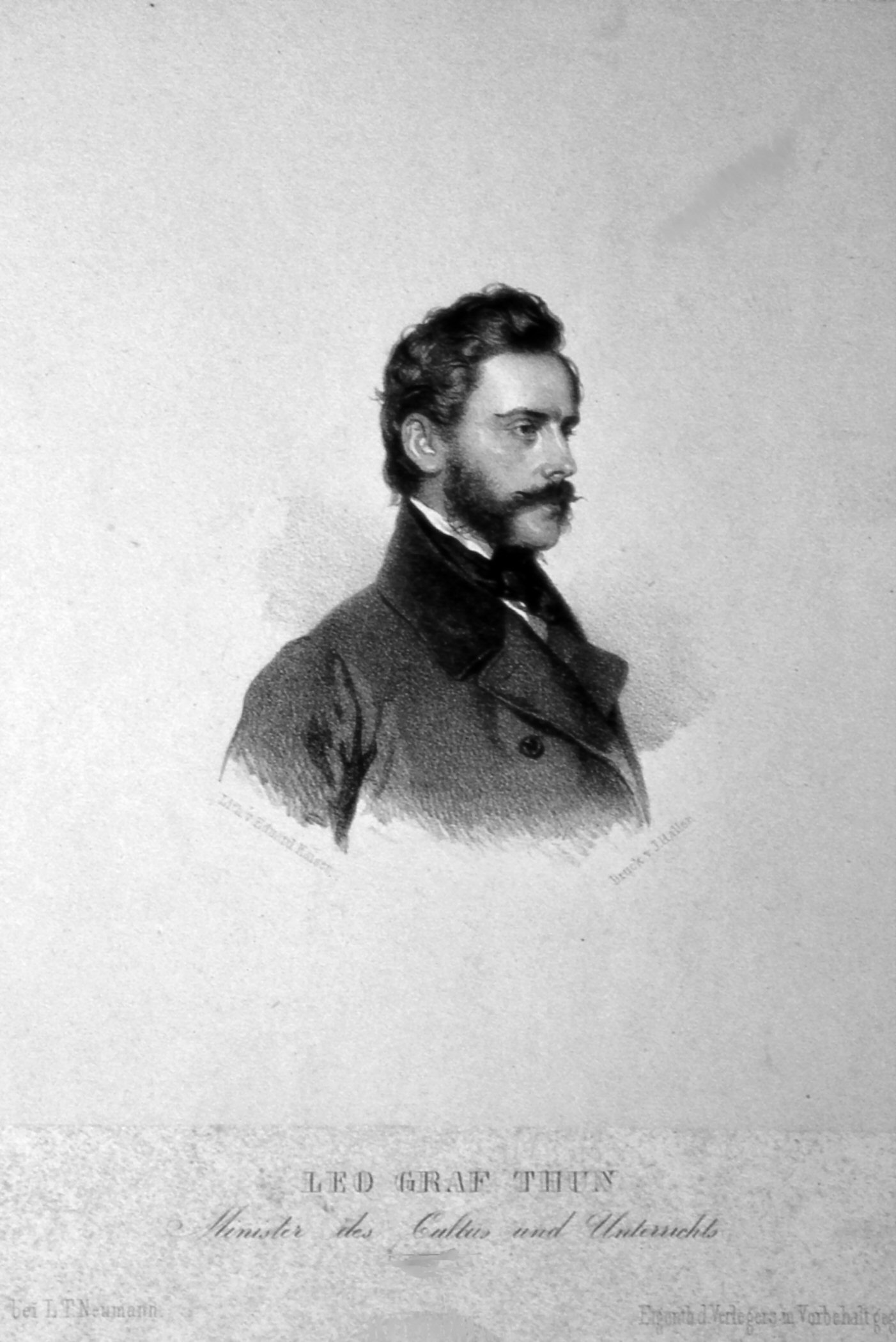
Leopold, Graf von Thun und Hohenstein, 1850

Leopold Graf von Thun und Hohenstein (7 April 1811 – 17 December 1888) was a leading Austrian statesman from the Thun und Hohenstein family.

== Early life ==
He was born in Děčín (Tetschen) as the third son of Count Franz von Thun und Hohenstein. After studying law and philosophy at the University of Prague he traveled through Europe, and among other countries he visited England, where he became acquainted with James Hope-Scott and other leaders of the Tractarian party. He was much affected by the romantic movement and the Ultramontane revival.

In 1847 he married Countess Clam-Martinic, but there was no issue of the marriage.

== Bohemian nationalist ==
After his return home he interested himself greatly in the revival of Czech language and Czech literature and the growth of Bohemian nationalism. He formed a personal friendship with František Palacký and other Czech leaders. He helped in the foundation of schools in which Czech should be taught, and set himself to acquire some knowledge of the language. He was also interested in prison reform, on which he wrote, and other philanthropic work. After serving under Stadion in Galicia, he was appointed in 1848, after the outbreak of the revolution, Regierungspräsident (president of the administration) and acting Statthalter (governor) in Bohemia.

He had scarcely entered on his duties when the rebellion of June broke out in Prague. In order to avoid bloodshed, he went down to the insurgents on the barricade, but was seized by them, imprisoned, and for some time his life was in danger. On his release he vigorously supported Alfred I, Prince of Windisch-Grätz, who was in command of the troops, in the restoration of order, but thereby lost his popularity and was superseded. He still defended the Bohemian national movement, and in one of his writings laid down the principle that nationality was one of the interests outside the control of the state.

== Minister of education and religion ==
In 1849 he accepted the office of minister of religion and education, which he held in 1860 under the autocratic and centralizing administration of Schwarzenberg and Baron Alexander von Bach. At first he threw himself with great energy into the task of building up an adequate system of schools. He summoned experienced teachers, Protestant as well as Catholic, from Germany, established middle and higher schools in all parts of the empire, superseded the antiquated textbooks and methods of instruction, and encouraged the formation of learned societies and the growth of a professional spirit and independence among the teachers. It is noticeable that at this time he insisted on the use of the German language in all schools of higher education. As minister of religion he was to a certain extent responsible for the concordat which again subjected the schools to the control of the Church: to a certain extent he thereby undid some of his work for the extension of education, and it was of him that Grillparzer said, "I have to announce a suicide. The minister of religion has murdered the minister of education." But during his administration the influence of the Church over the schools was really much less than, by the theory of the concordat, it would have appeared to be. The crisis of 1860, when the office he held was abolished, was the end of his official career.

== Federalist party ==
For the rest of his life he was a prominent leader of the Federalist party in Bohemia. His high social position, his influence at court, his character, as well as his undoubted abilities and learning, not often in Austria found in a man of his rank, gave him great influence. He supported the claims of Bohemia to a full autonomy; he strongly attacked both the February constitution and the Ausgleich with Hungary; what he desired was a common parliament for the whole empire based on a settlement with each one of the territories. With the old Czechs he refused to recognise the constitution of 1867; he helped to draft the declaration of 1868 and the fundamental articles of 1871, and took a leading part in the negotiations during the ministry of Potocki and Hohenwart. In order to found a strong Conservative party he established a paper, the Vaterland, which was the organ of the Clerical and Federalist party. He protested against the ecclesiastical legislation of 1867 and 1873.

He died in Vienna on 17 December 1888.
