= Johann Nepomuk Karl, Prince of Liechtenstein =

Prince of Liechtenstein from 1732 to 1748

Johann Nepomuk Karl
- Duke of Troppau and Jägerndorf
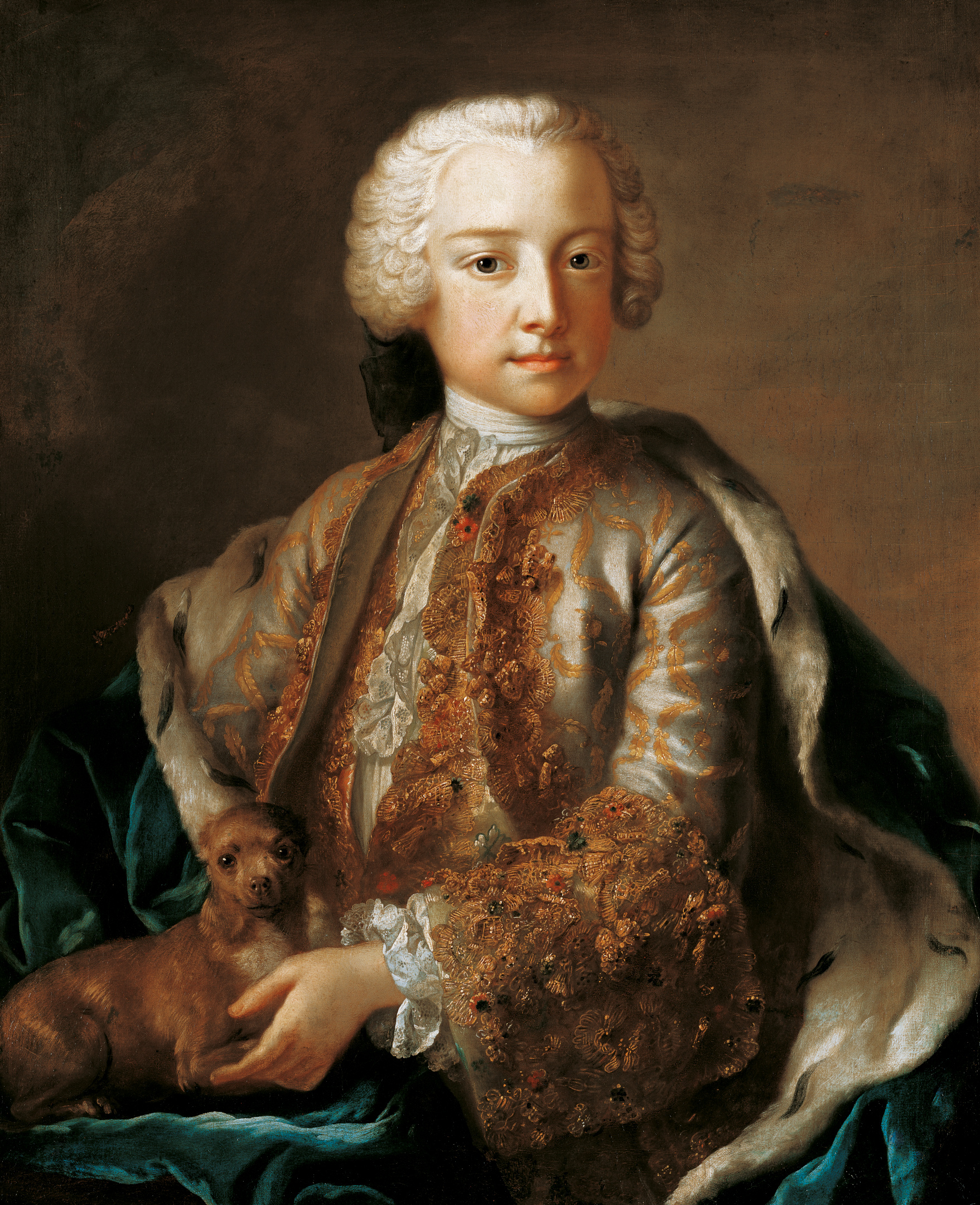
- Portrait by Etienne Chevalier

Prince of Liechtenstein
- Reign: 17 December 1732 – 22 December 1748
- Predecessor: Joseph Johann Adam
- Successor: Joseph Wenzel I
- Born: 6 July 1724
- Died: 22 December 1748 (aged 24); Wischau, Kingdom of Bohemia
- Burial: Church of the Nativity of the Virgin Mary, Brno
- Spouse: Countess Maria Josepha of Harrach-Rohrau (m. 1744)
- Issue: Princess Maria Anna; Prince Joseph Johannes Nepomuk; Princess Maria Antonia
Names
- Johann Nepomuk Karl Borromäus Josef Franz de Paula
- House: Liechtenstein
- Father: Joseph Johann Adam, Prince of Liechtenstein
- Mother: Countess Marie Anna of Oettingen-Spielberg
- Religion: Roman Catholic

Johann Nepomuk Karl (Johann Nepomuk Karl Borromäus Josef Franz de Paula; 6 July 1724 – 22 December 1748) was the Prince of Liechtenstein between 1732 and 1748.

== Early life ==
He was the son of Joseph Johann Adam, Prince of Liechtenstein and his second wife, Countess Maria Anna Katharina of Oettingen-Spielberg (1693-1729).

== Career ==
When his father died, Johann Nepomuk Karl was only eight and his uncle Josef Wenzel ruled as regent and took care of his nephew's education, preparing him for his future role. When Johann Nepomuk Karl took over the rule of his domains alone in 1745, it seemed that his uncle had taught him nothing, because the prince soon neglected the government and otherwise had seen little economic success.

Because of the evident inability of the prince, a royal Hungarian and Bohemian royal chamberlain was appointed to rule. The prince died shortly afterwards in 1748 at Wischau aged 24 years, being the youngest Prince of Liechtenstein to die. Upon his death, he was succeeded by Joseph Wenzel I.

== Personal life ==
In Vienna on 19 March 1744 Johann Nepomuk Karl married his cousin Maria Josepha, Countess of Harrach-Rohrau (1727–1788), daughter of Count Friedrich August von Harrach-Rohrau and his wife, Princess Maria Eleonora of Liechtenstein (1793-1757). They had three children:

- Princess Maria Anna (1745–1752), who died young.
- Prince Joseph Johannes Nepomuk Xaver Gotthard Adam Franz de Paula Frederick (1747–1747), who died in infancy.
- Princess Maria Antonia Josepha Theresia Walburga (1749–1813), who was born posthumously; she married Wenzel, 2nd Prince Paar, only son of Wenzel, 1st Prince Paar, in 1768. They had 10 children; Antonia Maria (1765-1838), Wenzel (1770-1800), Joseph (1770-1773), Karl (1773-1819), Ferdinand (1774), Maria Theresia Henriette (1778-1854), Johann Baptist (1780-1839), Maria Claudia (1781-1783), Ludwig Joseph (1783-1849), Niklas Franz (1785-1824)

The Prince died on 22 December 1748. His widow, Maria Josepha, died on 15 February 1788.

=== Descendants ===
Through his only surviving child Princess Maria Antonia, he was posthumously a grandfather of Karl, 3rd Prince Paar (1773–1819), who married Countess Guidobaldine von Cavriani (the daughter of Count Ludwig Franz von Cavriani). They were the parents of, among others, Karl, 4th Prince Paar (1806–1881), who married Princess Ida Leopoldine Sophie Marie Josephine Franziska of Liechtenstein (youngest daughter of Johann I Joseph, Prince of Liechtenstein and Landgravine Josepha of Fürstenberg-Weitra).

Johann Nepomuk Karl, Prince of Liechtenstein House of Liechtenstein Born: 1724 Died: 1748
Regnal titles
Preceded by Joseph Johann Adam	Prince of Liechtenstein; 1732–1748	Succeeded by Joseph Wenzel I
