= Anna Maria of Liechtenstein =

Princess of Liechtenstein from 1748 to 1753

Anna Maria
- Duchess of Troppau and Jägerndorf
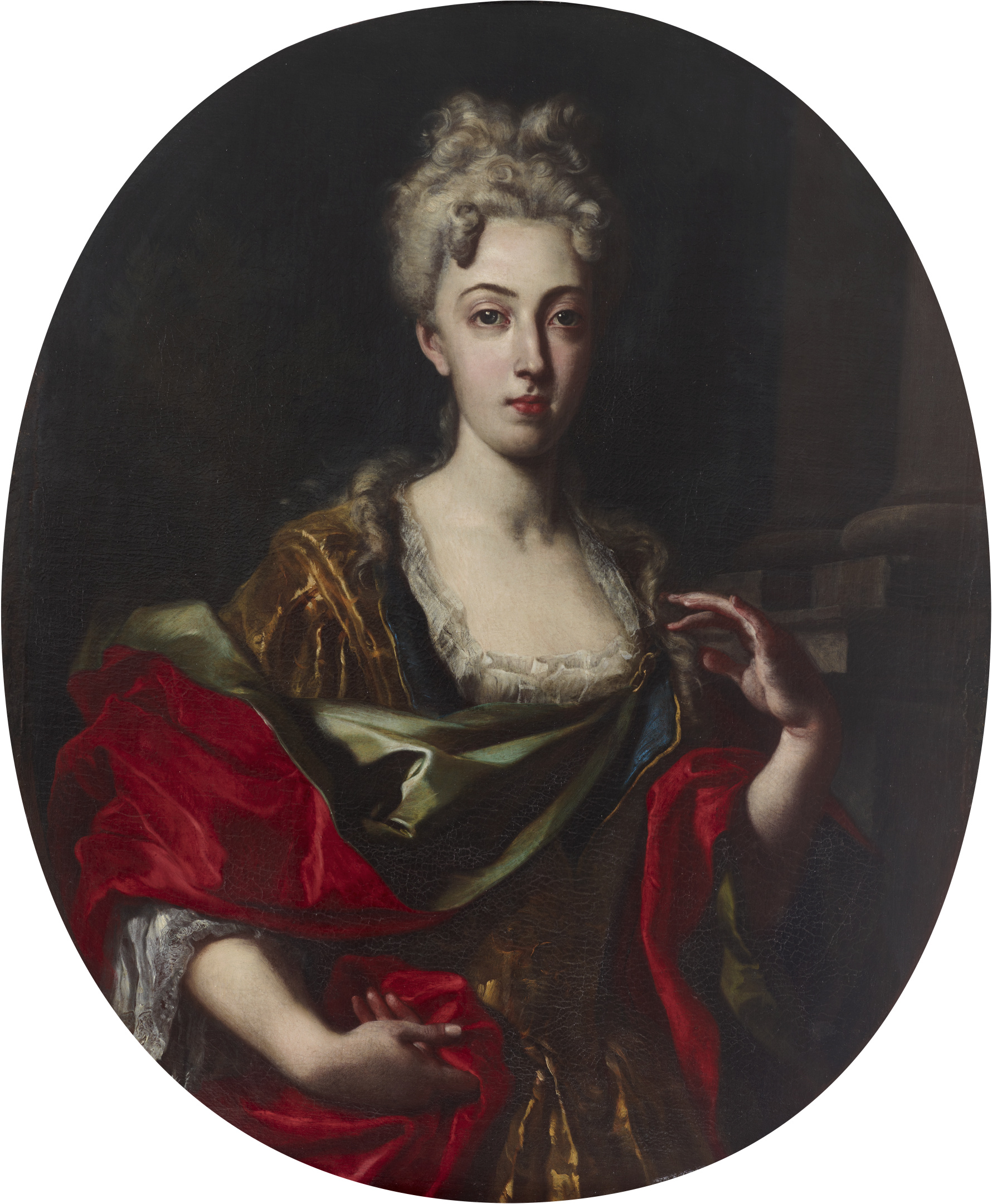

Princess consort of Liechtenstein
- Tenure: 22 December 1748 – 20 January 1753
- Born: 11 September 1699; Vienna, Austria
- Died: 20 January 1753 (aged 53); Vienna, Austria
- Burial: Paulanerkirche, Vienna
- Spouse: Johann Ernst of Thun-Hohenstein (m. 1716; died 1717) Joseph Wenzel I of Liechtenstein (m. 1718)
- Issue: Prince Philipp Anton; Prince Philipp Anton; Prince Philipp Ernst; Princess Maria Elisabeth; Princess Marie Alexandra
Names
- Anna Maria Antonie
- House: Liechtenstein
- Father: Anton Florian of Liechtenstein
- Mother: Countess Eleonore Barbara of Thun-Hohenstein

Anna Maria Antonie of Liechtenstein (11 September 1699 in Vienna – 20 January 1753 in Vienna), was a princess consort of Liechtenstein; married 19 April 1718 to her cousin prince Joseph Wenzel I, Prince of Liechtenstein.

== Marriage and issue ==
Anna Maria married firstly Count Johann Ernst of Thun-Hohenstein (1694–1717), in 1716, without issue.

Anna Maria married secondly her cousin, Joseph Wenzel I of Liechtenstein (1696–1772), in 1718. They had five children, all of whom died in early childhood:

- Prince Philipp Anton (1719).
- Prince Philipp Anton (1720).
- Prince Philipp Ernst (1722–1723).
- Princess Maria Elisabeth (1724).
- Princess Marie Alexandra (1727).

== Arms ==
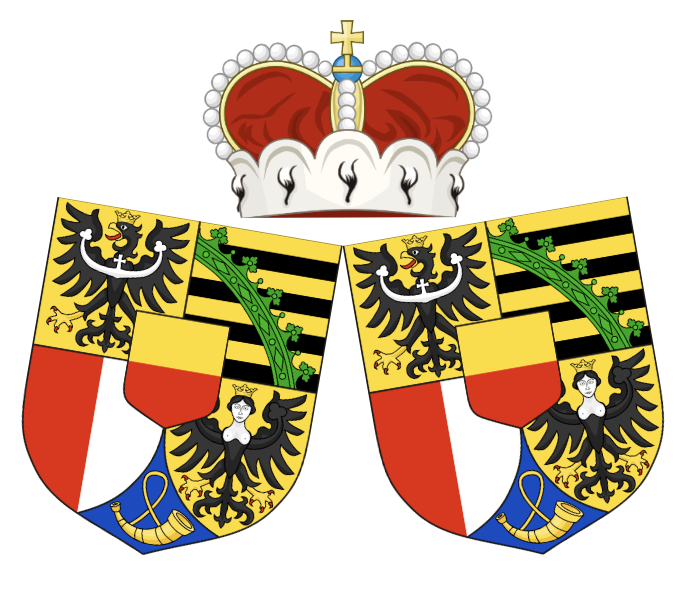

== Ancestry ==
Ancestors of Anna Maria of Liechtenstein

16. Baron Hartmann II of Liechtenstein, Lord of Valtice, Lednice and Steyregg
8. Gundakar, Prince of Liechtenstein
17. Countess Anna Maria of Ortenburg
4. Prince Hartmann III of Liechtenstein
18. Enno III, Count of East Frisia
9. Countess Agnes of East Frisia
19. Countess Walburga of Rietberg
2. Anton Florian, Prince of Liechtenstein
20. Count Werner of Salm-Reifferscheidt-Dyck
10. Count Ernst Friedrich of Salm-Reifferscheidt
21. Countess Maria of Limburg-Stirum
5. Countess Sidonie Elisabeth of Salm-Reifferscheidt
22. Emich IX, Count of Leiningen-Dagsburg-Falkenburg
11. Countess Maria Ursula of Leiningen-Dagsburg-Falkenburg
23. Baroness Ursula of Fleckenstein
1. Princess Anna Maria of Liechtenstein
24. Count Johann Cyprian of Thun and Hohenstein
12. Count Johann Sigismund of Thun and Hohenstein
25. Baroness Anna Maria of Preysing
6. Count Michael Oswald of Thund and Hohenstein
26. Count Marcus Oswald of Wolkenstein-Trostburg
13. Countess Anna Margaretha of Wolkenstein-Trostburg
27. Countess Anna Maria Khuen of Belasi
3. Countess Eleonore Barbara of Thun and Hohenstein
28. Count Nicolaus of Lodron
14. Count Christoph of Lodron
29. Baroness Dorothea of Welsberg
7. Countess Elisabeth of Lodron
30. Count Anton of Spaur and Flavon
15. Countess Katharina of Spaur and Flavon
31. Baroness Emerentia of Preysing

== Sources ==
- Principality of Liechtenstein

Anna Maria of Liechtenstein Princely Family of Liechtenstein Born: 11 September 1699 Died: 20 January 1753
Liechtensteiner royalty
Preceded by Maria Josefa von Harrach	Princess consort of Liechtenstein; 1748–1753	Succeeded by Maria Leopoldine von Sternberg
