= Joseph Johann Adam, Prince of Liechtenstein =

Prince of Liechtenstein from 1721 to 1732

Joseph Johann Adam
- Duke of Troppau and Jägerndorf
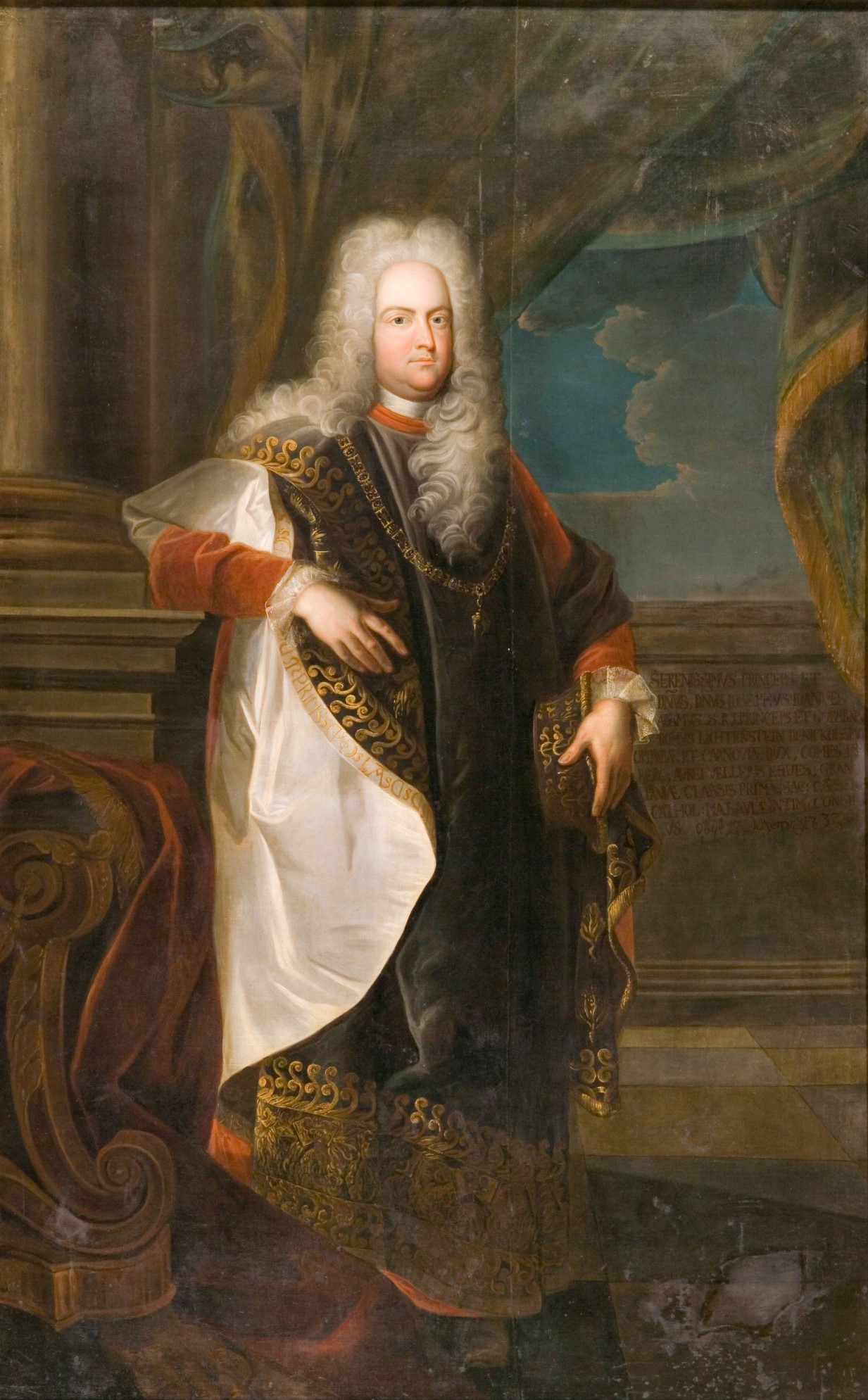
- 18th-century portrait

Prince of Liechtenstein
- Reign: 11 October 1721 – 17 December 1732
- Predecessor: Anton Florian
- Successor: Johann Nepomuk
- Born: 25 May 1690; Vienna, Archduchy of Austria
- Died: 17 December 1732 (aged 42); Valtice, Kingdom of Bohemia
- Burial: Church of the Nativity of the Virgin Mary, Brno
- Spouse: Maria Gabriele of Liechtenstein (m. 1712; died 1713) Marianne of Thun-Hohenstein (m. 1716; died 1716) Maria Anna of Oettingen-Spielberg (m. 1716; died 1729) Maria Anna Kottulinska (m. 1729)
- Issue: Prince Karl Anton Joseph; Princess Maria Eleonore; Prince Joseph Anton Franz; Princess Maria Theresia; Johann Nepomuk Karl, Prince of Liechtenstein; Princess Maria Elisabeth; Prince Anton Thomas; Princess Maria Anna Josefa
- House: Liechtenstein
- Father: Anton Florian, Prince of Liechtenstein
- Mother: Countess Eleonore Barbara of Thun-Hohenstein
- Religion: Roman Catholic

Joseph Johann Adam (25 May 1690 – 17 December 1732) was the Prince of Liechtenstein from 1721 to his death in 1732.

Born in Vienna, he was the only living son of Anton Florian, Prince of Liechtenstein and Eleonore Barbara von Thun und Hohenstein. Johann Josef Adam served under his father for a short time during the War of the Spanish Succession and later fought against the French under the Duke of Marlborough. After the Treaty of Utrecht he became Imperial Privy Counsellor in Vienna.

He was the 661st Knight of the Order of the Golden Fleece in Austria. He died in Valtice in 1732.

== Marriages and issue ==
On 1 December 1712, Joseph married firstly his cousin Maria Gabriele, Princess of Liechtenstein (12 July 1692 – 7 November 1713), daughter of Hans-Adam I. They had one child:

- Prince Karl Anton Joseph Adam Bruno (6 October 1713 – 25 March 1715)

On 3 February 1716, Joseph married secondly Marianne, Countess of Thun-Hohenstein (27 September 1698 – 23 February 1716), but his new bride died only 20 days after the wedding.

On 3 August 1716, in Vienna, Joseph married thirdly to Maria Anna Katharina, Countess of Oettingen-Spielberg (21 September 1693 – 15 April 1729), daughter of Francis Albert, 1st Prince of Oettingen-Spielberg in 1734 (previously Count). They had five children:

- Princess Maria Eleonore Johanna Walburga Josepha (8 June 1717 – 1 July 1718).
- Prince Joseph Anton Franz Johann Nepomuk (17 Apr 1720 – 28 November 1723).
- Princess Maria Theresia Eleonora Walburga Innocentia (28 December 1721 – 19 January 1753), married Prince Joseph I Adam of Schwarzenberg (15 December 1722 – 17 February 1782) and had 9 children
- Johann Nepomuk Karl, Prince of Liechtenstein (6 July 1724 – 22 December 1748).
- Princess Maria Elisabeth Eleonore (born and died 18 May 1728).

On 22 August 1729, Joseph married fourthly to Maria Anna, Countess Kottulinsky von Kottulin (12 May 1707 – 6 February 1788). They had two children:

- Prince Anton Thomas Joseph Franz de Paula Johann Nepomuk Adam (21 December 1730 – 1731).
- Princess Maria Anna Josefa Antonia Franz de Paula (posthumously 2 April 1733 – 10 December 1734).

Joseph Johann Adam, Prince of Liechtenstein House of Liechtenstein Born: 1690 Died: 1732
Regnal titles
Preceded by Anton Florian	Prince of Liechtenstein; 1721–1732	Succeeded by Johann Nepomuk Karl
