= Anton Florian, Prince of Liechtenstein =

Prince of Liechtenstein from 1718 to 1721

Anton Florian
- Duke of Troppau and Jägerndorf
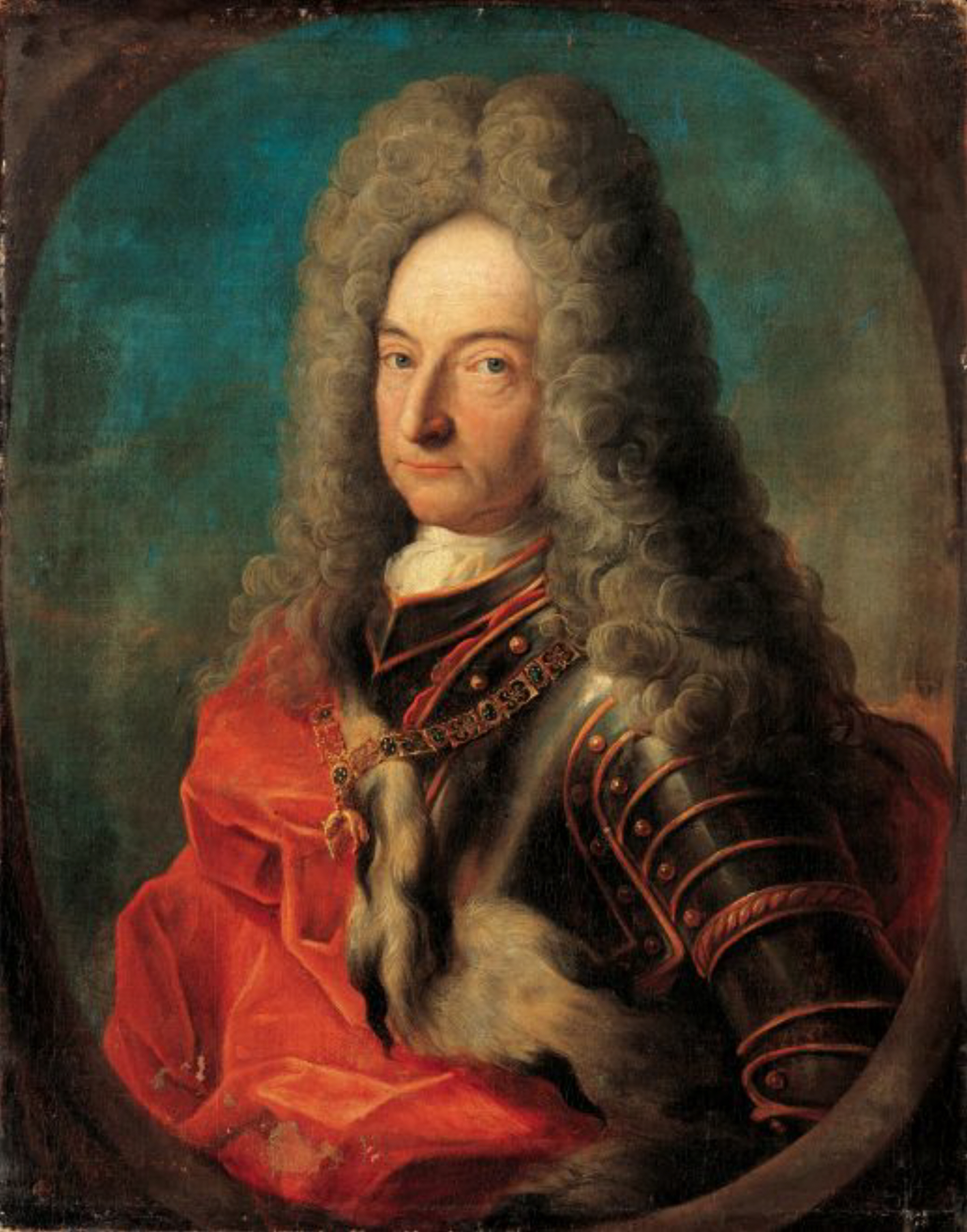
- Early 18th-century portrait

Prince of Liechtenstein
- Reign: 12 March 1718 – 11 October 1721
- Predecessor: Joseph Wenzel I
- Successor: Joseph Johann Adam
- Born: 28 May 1656; Wilfersdorf, Archduchy of Austria
- Died: 11 October 1721 (aged 65); Vienna, Archduchy of Austria
- Burial: Church of the Nativity of the Virgin Mary, Brno
- Spouse: Countess Eleonore Barbara of Thun-Hohenstein (m. 1679)
- Issue: Prince Franz Augustin; Princess Eleonore; Princess Antonia Maria Eleonore; Prince Karl Joseph Florian; Prince Anton Ignaz Joseph; Joseph Johann Adam, Prince of Liechtenstein; Prince Innozenz Franz Anton; Princess Maria Karoline Anna; Prince Karl Joseph; Princess Anna Maria Antonie; Princess Maria Eleonore
- House: Liechtenstein
- Father: Prince Hartmann III of Liechtenstein
- Mother: Countess Sidonie Elisabeth of Salm-Reifferscheidt
- Religion: Roman Catholic

Anton Florian (28 May 1656 – 11 October 1721) was the Prince of Liechtenstein between 1718 and 1721.

Anton Florian was born in Wilfersdorf, in what is now Lower Austria. During the War of the Spanish Succession, he went to Spain, where he was the Chief Intendant and Prime Minister of the Archduke Karl, who became Emperor Charles VI after the sudden death of his brother in 1711. Florian returned to Vienna for Charles's coronation. He was the Obersthofmeister (Imperial Chief Intendant) and Chairman of the Secret Council until he died in 1721.

On 23 January 1719, Charles VI created the new principality of Liechtenstein from the domains of Seigneury of Schellenberg and County of Vaduz, which were both held by the Liechtenstein family. This was done so that Anton Florian could be admitted to the Reichstag, which required that all members had land that was subordinate only to the Emperor himself (as opposed to land held in fief by higher nobles). Thus, Anton Florian became the first Prince of Liechtenstein.

Anton Florian was the 591st Knight of the Order of the Golden Fleece in Austria. He died in Vienna in 1721.

== Marriage and issue ==
Anton Florian married Countess Eleonore Barbara Catharina von Thun und Hohenstein on 15 October 1679. They had 11 children, most of whom died in early childhood:

- Prince Franz Augustin (1680–1681)
- Princess Eleonore (1681–1682)
- Princess Antonia Maria Eleonore (12 January 1683 – 19 December 1715) Married firstly to Johann Adam von Lamberg (1677-1708) had no issue, and secondly to Erghott Maximilian von Kuefstein (1676-1728) and had issue - Eleonora Maria Anna Agnes Praxedes Maximiliana (1711-1713), Maximilian Danckgott (1712-1713), Willgott Joseph Hartmann Johann Eulogius (1714-1716), Maria Carolina Eleonora Josepha Anna Elisabeth (1715)
- Prince Karl Joseph Florian (b. and d. 1685)
- Prince Anton Ignaz Joseph (1689–1690)
- Joseph Johann Adam, Prince of Liechtenstein (27 May 1690 – 17 December 1732)
- Prince Innozenz Franz Anton (1693–1707)
- Princess Maria Karoline Anna (23 August 1694 – 16 April 1735). Married Franz Wilhelm Altgraf zu Salm-Reifferscheidt (1672-1734), had one son Anton Joseph Franz (1720-1769)
- Prince Karl Joseph (1697–1704)
- Princess Anna Maria Antonie (1699–1753); married her cousin, Joseph Wenzel I, Prince of Liechtenstein
- Princess Maria Eleonore (1703 – 18 July 1757); married Count Friedrich August von Harrach-Rohrau and had 16 children.

Anton Florian, Prince of Liechtenstein House of Liechtenstein Born: 1656 Died: 1721
Regnal titles
Preceded by Joseph Wenzel I	Prince of Liechtenstein; 1718–1721	Succeeded by Joseph Johann Adam
