= Ducal hat of Liechtenstein =

Crown of the Princes of Liechtenstein

Herzogshut
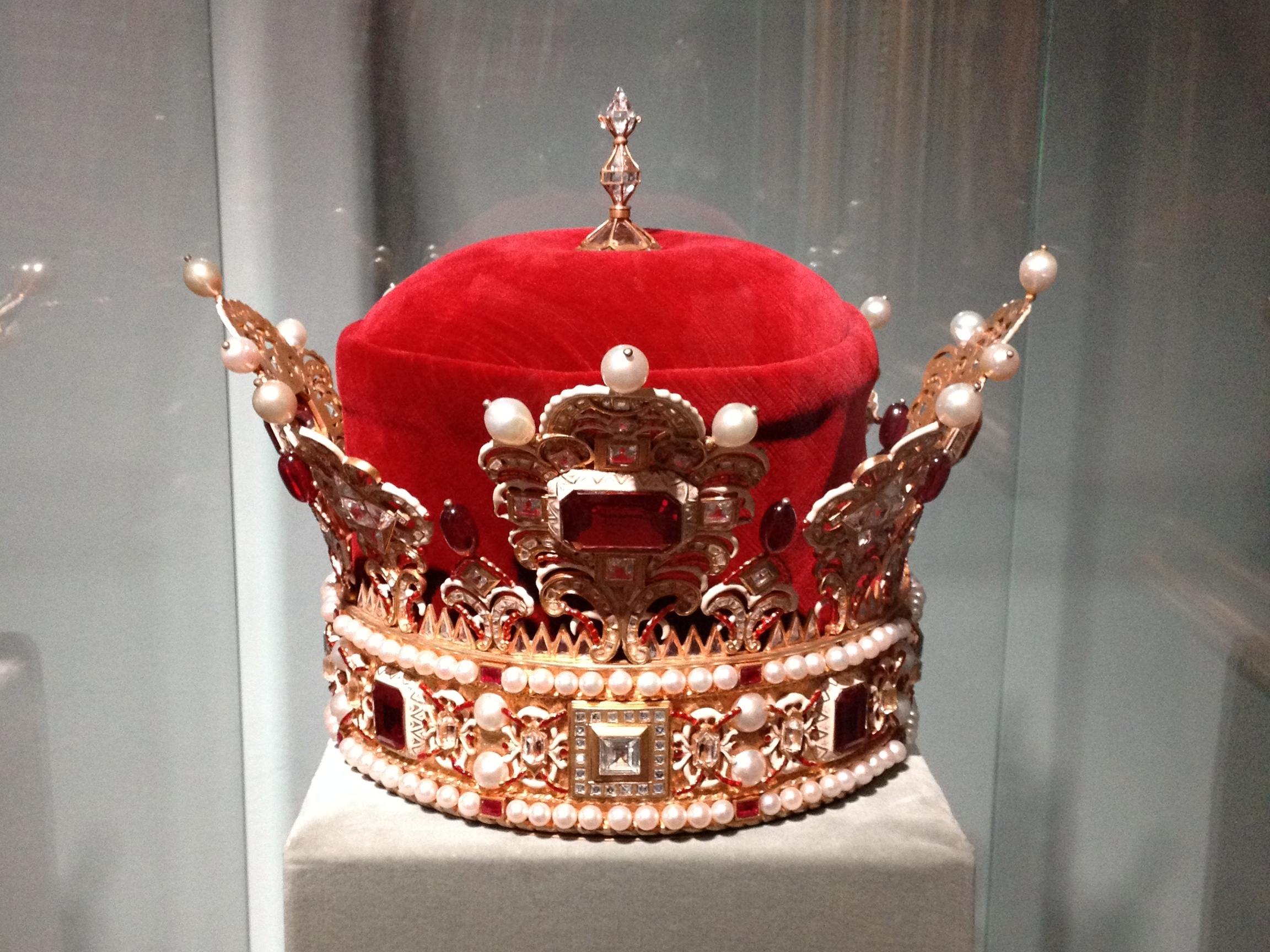
- Ducal hat of Liechtenstein

Details
- Country: Liechtenstein
- Made: 1626
- Destroyed: XVIII century (Note: Original allegedly destroyed in 18th century.)
- Arches: none
- Cap: Red Velvet
- Notable stones: Diamonds, pearls, rubies

The Ducal hat of Liechtenstein (German: Herzogshut) is the crown of the Princes of Liechtenstein, who were also Dukes of Troppau and Jägerndorf. It went missing in the 18th century and was recast in the 1970s as a gift of the people of Liechtenstein to their prince.

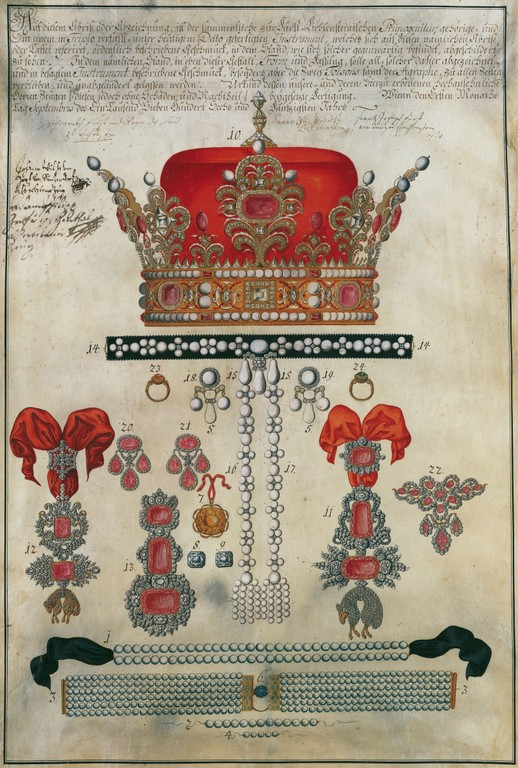
Ducal hat and insignia of the princely Liechtenstein primogeniture (gouache from 1756, Liechtenstein Museum)

== History ==
The ducal hat of Liechtenstein was commissioned in 1623 by Prince Karl I of Liechtenstein and completed in 1626 by the jeweller Daniel de Briers. It was discovered to be missing in 1781, following the death of Prince Franz Joseph I, and it remains lost to the House of Liechtenstein since that time.

In 1976, the people of Liechtenstein presented a replica of the crown to Prince Franz Josef II on his 70th birthday. The replica is based on the only drawing of the crown, a 1756 gouache painting that is kept in the Liechtenstein Museum. The new Ducal Hat is now displayed in the Treasure Chamber (Schaatzkammer) of Liechtenstein in Vaduz.

The circlet of the crown was modeled on the circlet of the Imperial Crown of Austria, while eight jeweled acanthus leaves, alternately large and small, rested on the rim of the circlet. As with the imperial crown of Rudolf II, the precious stones used in this crown were white (diamonds and pearls) and red (rubies or red spinels), which may have had some alchemist significance. Inside the crown was a red velvet cap topped with a large jeweled button.

The gems used on the crown were chosen in accordance with the alchemical principles subscribed to in the Rudolphine Court, with the crown apparently being designed to protect its possessor against evil.

According to Emperor Rudolph's physician, Anselmus de Boodt (1550–1632), diamonds have an inherent power that wards off evil spirits, rubies protect against illness and poison and will warn the wearer when danger threatens by turning dark, and pearls strengthen the health of the wearer and counter the effects of poison.
