= Friedrich August von Harrach-Rohrau =

Plenipotentiary minister of the Austrian Netherlands

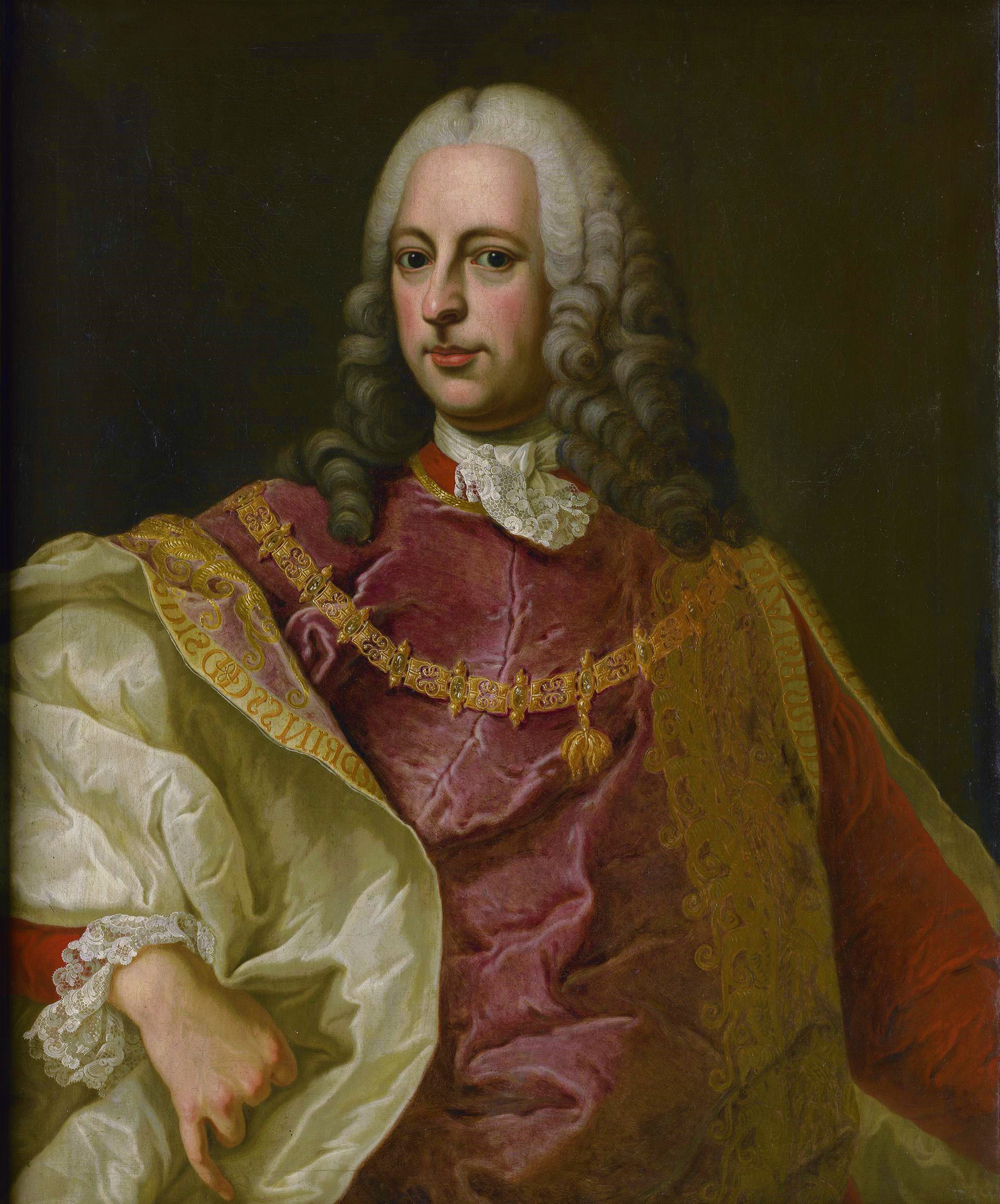

Plenipotentiary Minister of Austrian Netherlands
- Tenure: 1732 – 1741
- Predecessor: Giulio Visconti
- Successor: Karl Ferdinand

Governor of the Austrian Netherlands (ad interim)
- Tenure: 1741–1744.
- Predecessor: Maria Elisabeth
- Successor: Maria Anna

High Chancellor of Bohemia
- Reign: 1745–1749
- Predecessor: Philip Kinsky
- Successor: Position Abolished
- Born: 8 June 1696; Vienna, Austrian Empire
- Died: 4 June 1749 (aged 52); Vienna, Austrian Empire
- Spouse: Maria Eleanora
- Issue Detail: Maria Rosa; Maria Josepha
- House: Harrach
- Father: Aloys Thomas Raimund
- Mother: Anna Caecilie

Count Friedrich August von Harrach-Rohrau, (Vienna, 8 June 1696 – Vienna, 4 June 1749), was plenipotentiary minister of the Austrian Netherlands (1732–1741) and became Governor-General ad interim in 1741–1744. He was also High Chancellor of Bohemia from 1745 until his death.

== Early life ==
By birth member of the House of Harrach, he was born as the eldest son and child of Count Aloys Thomas Raimund von Harrach und Rohrau (1669–1742) and his second wife Countess Anna Caecilie von Thannhausen (1674–1721).

== Marriage and issue ==
He married Princess Maria Eleonora of Liechtenstein (1703 – 17 July 1757), the youngest daughter of Prince Anton Florian of Liechtenstein and his wife Countess Eleonore Barbara von Thun und Hohenstein, on 5 February 1719. They had 16 children:

- Franz Anton (13 May 1720 – 25 March 1724)
- Maria Rosa (20 August 1721 – 29 August 1785) Who married her paternal uncle Ferdinand Bonaventura II von Harrach
- Johann Josef (18 September 1722 – 8 December 1746)
- Ernst Guido (8 September 1723 – 23 March 1783); his successor
- Maria Anna (27 April 1725 – 29 April 1780)
- Anna Viktoria (1726 – 6 January 1746)
- Maria Josepha (20 November 1727 – 15 February 1788); married her cousin, Prince Johann Nepomuk Karl of Liechtenstein
- Maximilian Josef (13 September 1729 – 6 March 1730)
- Bonaventura (20 March 1731 – 14 February 1794)
- Ignaz Ludwig (2 October 1732 – 11 March 1753)
- Franz Xaver (2 October 1732 – 15 February 1781)
- Johann Leopold (12 December 1733 – 27 September 1734)
- Maria Elisabeth (19 May 1735 – 9 June 1735)
- Ferdinand (4 January 1737 – 27 March 1748)
- Johann Nepomuk Ernst (20 May 1738 – 17 December 1739)
- Maria Christina (24 July 1740 – 27 November 1791)

== Descendants ==
Ernst Guido's great-great-grandson was Lieutenant Colonel Count Franz von Harrach, Archduke Franz Ferdinand of Austria's Aide-de-camp when he was assassinated in Sarajevo on 28 June 1914.

== Literature ==
Ghislaine De Boom, Les ministres plénipotentaires dans les Pays-Bas autrichiens, principalement Cobenzl, Brussels: Académie Royale de Belgique (1932).

Ghislaine De Boom, "L'Archiduchesse Marie-Elisabeth et les Grands Maitres de la cour", Revue Belge de Philologie et d'Histoire 5/2-3 (1926), pp. 495–506.

Preceded by Maria Elisabeth of Austria	Governor of the Austrian Netherlands; 1741–1744	Succeeded by Maria Anna of Austria
