= Thun und Hohenstein family =

Former noble family

Coat of arms of the House of Thun und Hohenstein

The House of Thun und Hohenstein, also known as Thun-Hohenstein, belonged to the historical Austrian and later Bohemian nobility. There is one princely and several comital branches of the family. The princely branch of the family lived at Děčín (German: Tetschen) in Bohemia for more than 200 years. The family maintained an expansive library, including two important albums depicting artistically and technologically innovative armour made for the Habsburg court during the fifteenth and sixteenth centuries.

== History ==
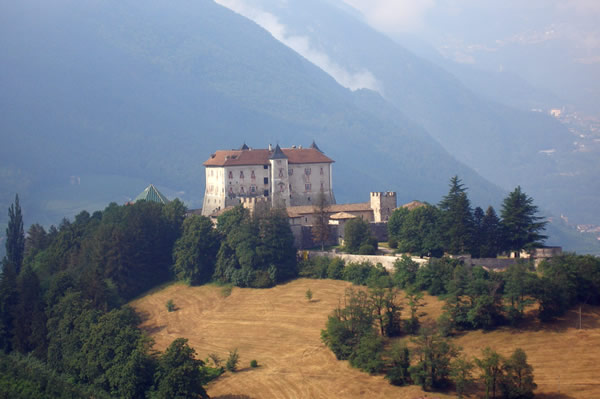
Thun Castle at Ton, Trentino, Italy

A feudal family originally from Ton, Trentino, formerly an Italian-speaking part of Tyrol (today part of the Trentino province of Italy), the male line traces back to Manfreinus of Tunno in 1187. In 1469, they became hereditary cup-bearers of the Prince-Bishopric of Trent and in 1558 of the Prince-Bishopric of Brixen.

== Titles of Baron, Count and Prince ==
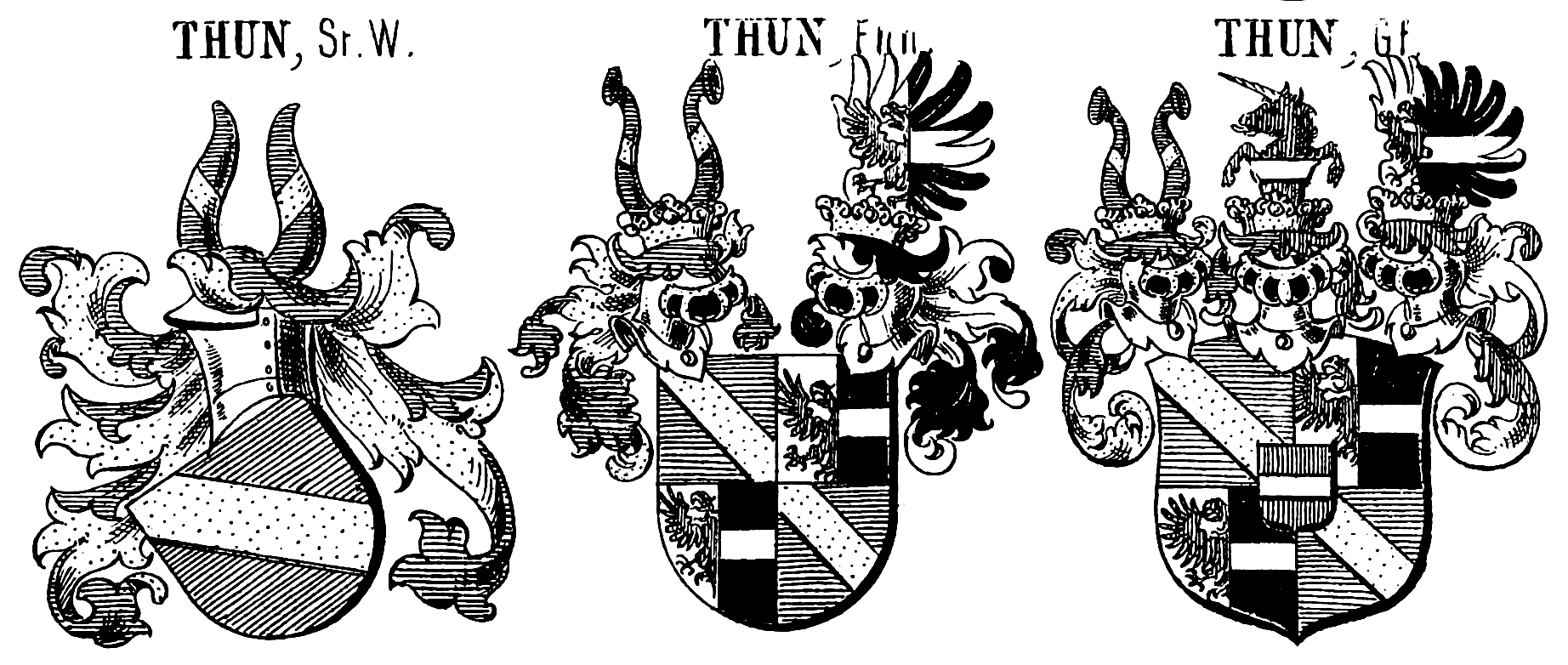
The family's original, baronial and comital arms (from left to right)

All males of the family were granted the hereditary title of Freiherr (Baron) in 1604, and Reichsgraf (Count of the Holy Roman Empire) in 1629. The title of Fürst (Prince) was conferred on 19 July 1911 by Emperor Franz Joseph upon the head of the family, along with the style of Durchlaucht (Serene Highness), in the Austro-Hungarian Empire. They were hereditary members of the Austrian House of Lords, in right of possession of the entailed lordship of Tetschen since 1879.

== Properties in Bohemia ==
The family acquired Klášterec nad Ohří Chateau in 1621, Jílové Castle in 1629 (expropriated in 1946), and Děčín Castle in the second half of the 17th century, which became the family's main seat until it was sold in 1932. They also acquired Choltice Castle and Benátky nad Jizerou Castle, and several palaces in Prague.

== Notable family members ==
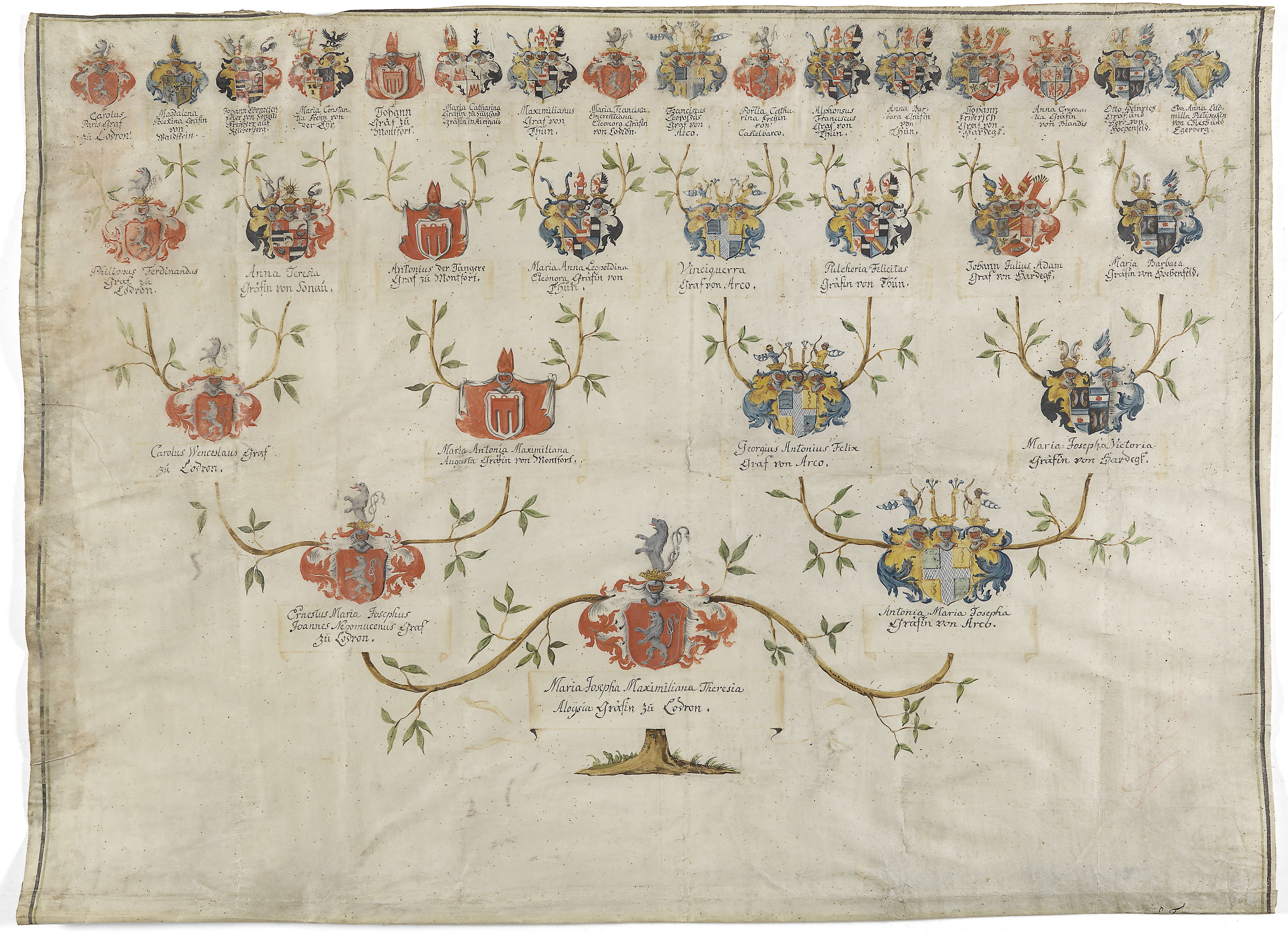
Arms of Alfonso Franz (1625–1688), Anna Barbara (1632–1709) and their daughter Pulcheria Felicitas von Thun und Hohenstein displayed on an 18th-century ancestry chart

=== Friedrich von Thun und Hohenstein ===
Of the three sons of Count Franz Anton (1786–1873) and his wife Countess Theresia Anna Maria (née von Brühl), the eldest, Friedrich von Thun und Hohenstein (1810–1881), entered the diplomatic service. After holding other posts he was in 1850 appointed president of the restored German Diet at Frankfurt, where he represented the anti-Prussian policy of Prince Felix Schwarzenberg, and often came into conflict with Prince von Bismarck, who was the Prussian envoy. He was afterwards ambassador at Berlin and St. Petersburg.

After his retirement in 1863 from the public service in the Bohemian Landtag and the Austrian Reichsrat he supported the federal policy of his brother Leo. In 1879 he was made a hereditary member of the Upper House. In this position he was, on his death 24 September 1881, succeeded by his eldest son Franz (born 1847).

=== Maria Wilhelmine von Thun und Hohenstein ===
Countess Maria Wilhelmine von Thun und Hohenstein, née Countess von Ulfeldt was a Viennese aristocrat of the 18th century. She was the hostess of a musically and intellectually outstanding salon, and a patroness of music, notably that of Mozart and Beethoven.

=== Leopold von Thun und Hohenstein ===
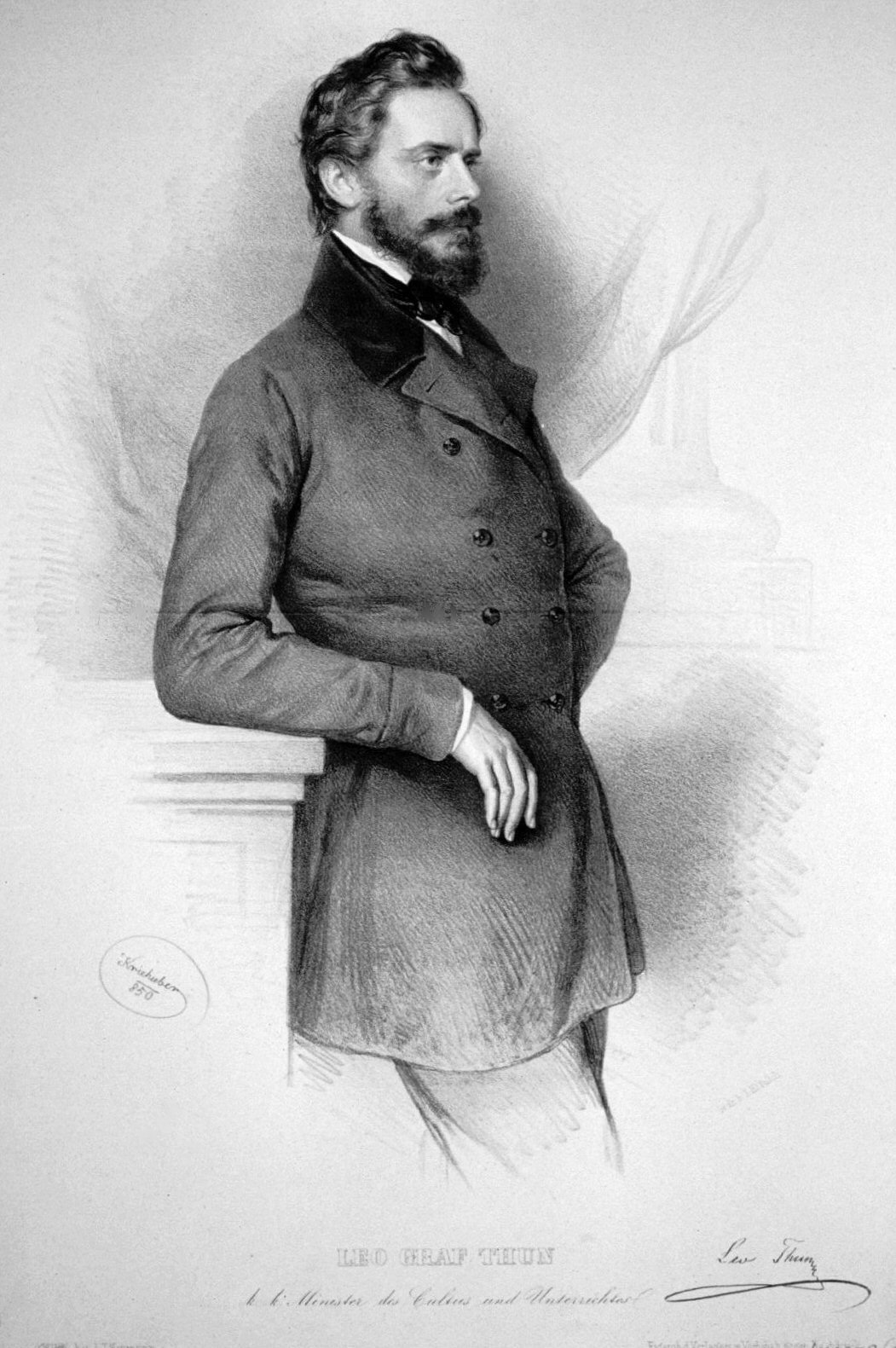
Leopold, Graf von Thun und Hohenstein

Count Leopold von Thun und Hohenstein (1811–1888) was a leading Austrian statesman who was later a minister in the cabinets of Schwarzenberg and Bach.

=== Franz von Thun und Hohenstein ===
Count Franz Anton von Thun und Hohenstein, Czech: hrabě František Antonín z Thunu a Hohensteina (1847–1916) was an Austro-Hungarian nobleman and statesman. He was Governor of his native Bohemia from 1889 to 1896 and again from 1911 to 1915. He became the Prime Minister of the Empire of Austria in 1898 (officially Minister-President of Cisleithania). He was elevated to the rank of Prince by Emperor Franz Joseph I of Austria on 19 July 1911. Leaving no sons, he was succeeded in the princely title by his brother Jaroslav (1864–1929), brother-in-law of Archduke Franz Ferdinand of Austria (the heir to the Throne of Austria-Hungary killed in 1914).

=== Galeas von Thun und Hohenstein ===
Fra' Galeas von Thun und Hohenstein (1850–1931) was the 75th Prince and Grand Master of the Sovereign Military Order of Malta from 1905 to 1931.

=== Róża Maria von Thun und Hohenstein ===
Róża Maria Fürstin von Thun und Hohenstein (née Woźniakowska, Prawdzic coat of arms, born 13 April 1954), usually shortened to Róża Thun, married Franz Graf von Thun und Hohenstein in 1981. After the death of his father in 1990, Franz became the Head of the family and automatically assumed the title of Fürst. She has been a European Parliament Member (MEP) from Poland between 2009 and 2024.

== Other prominent members ==
- Wenzeslaus of Thun (1629–1673), prince-bishop of Passau from 1664 to 1673
- Johann Ernst von Thun und Hohenstein (1643–1709), prince-archbishop of Salzburg from 1687 to 1709
- Eleonore Barbara von Thun und Hohenstein (1661–1723), princess consort of Liechtenstein
- Giovanni Thun Hohenstein (1913–1938), Italian soldier
- Friedrich von Thun (born 1942), Austrian actor
- Matteo Thun (born 1952), Italian architect
- Max von Thun (born 1977), German-Austrian actor

== Historic properties ==
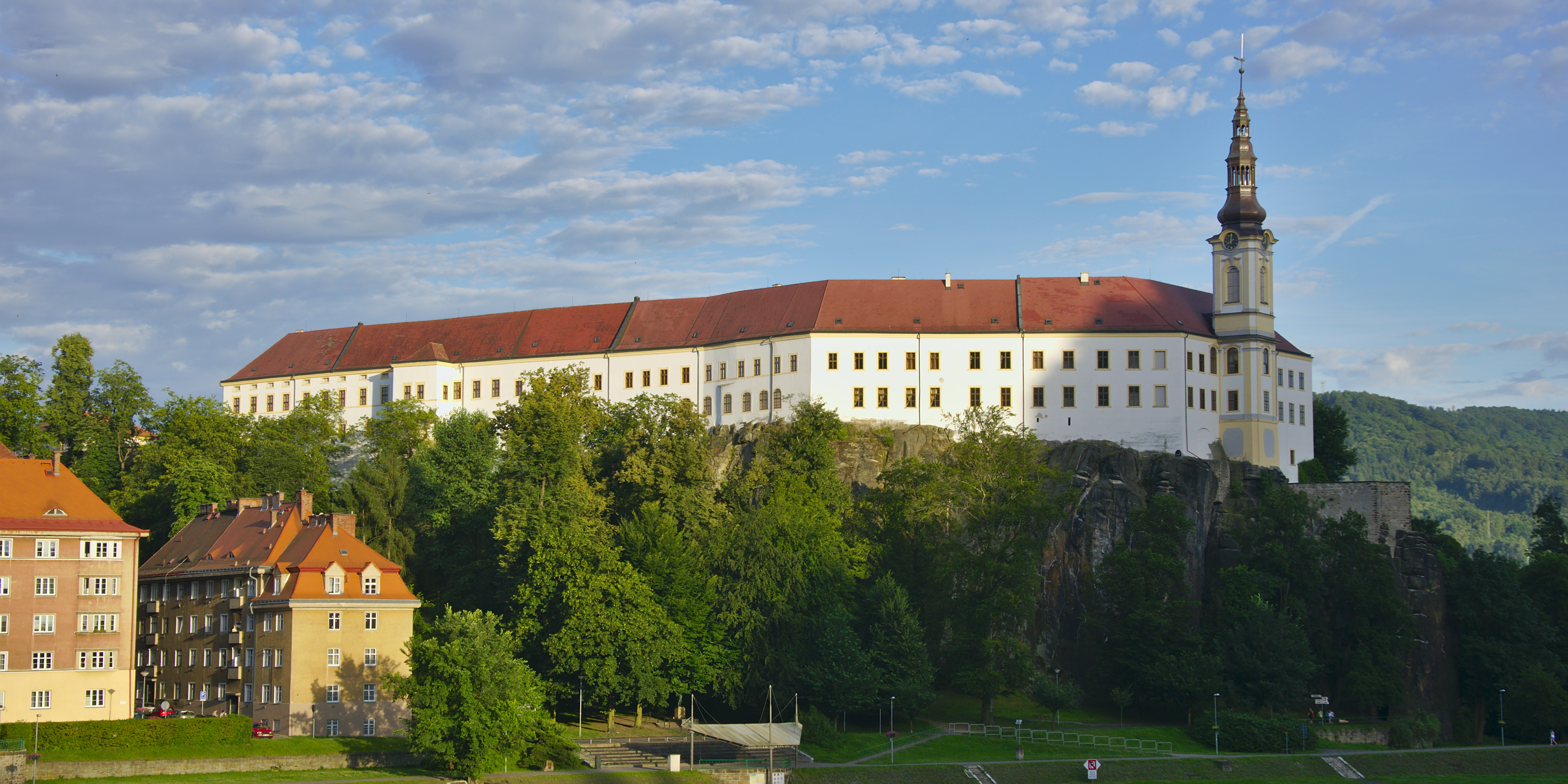
Děčín Castle

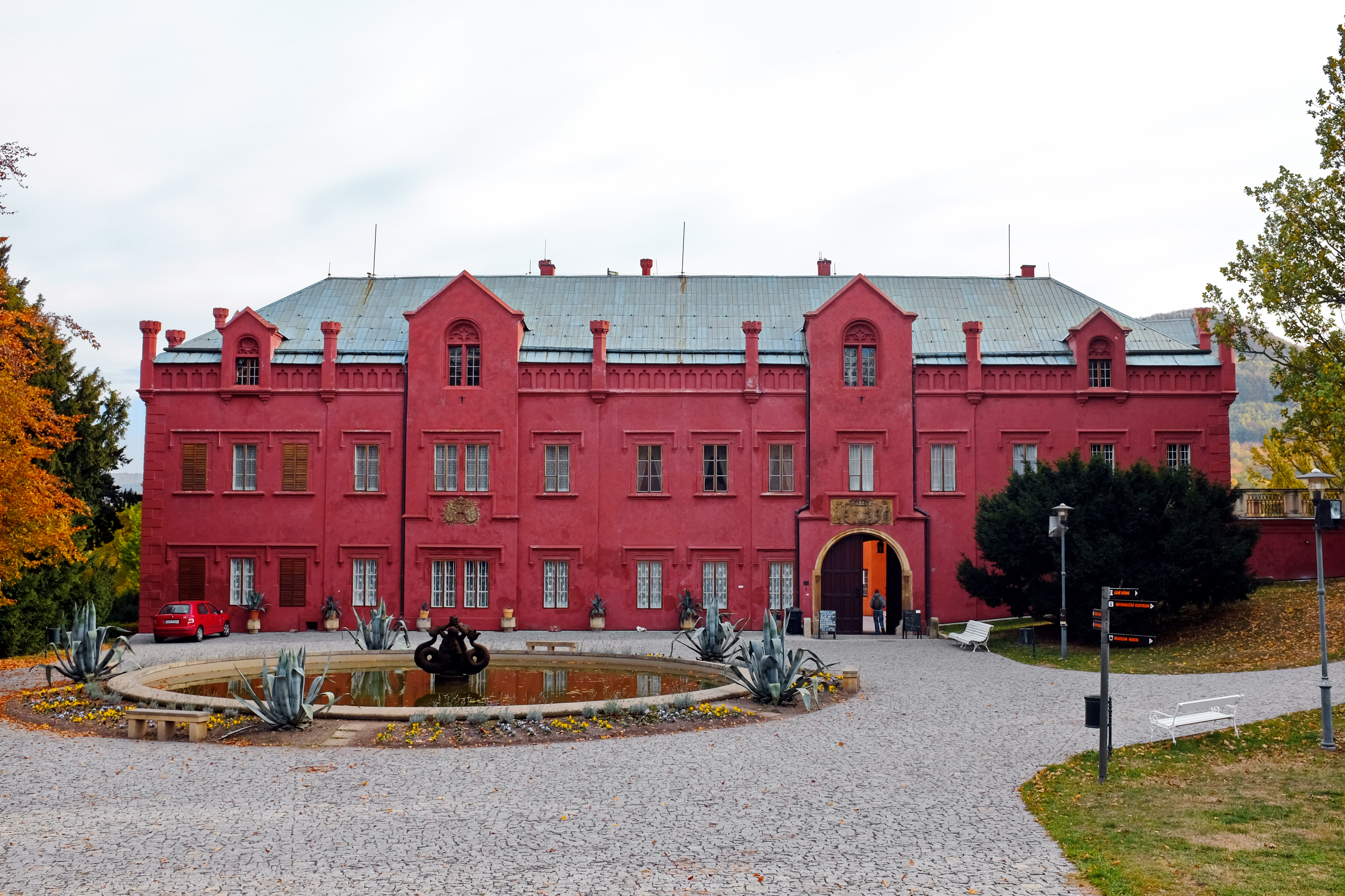
Klášterec nad Ohří Chateau

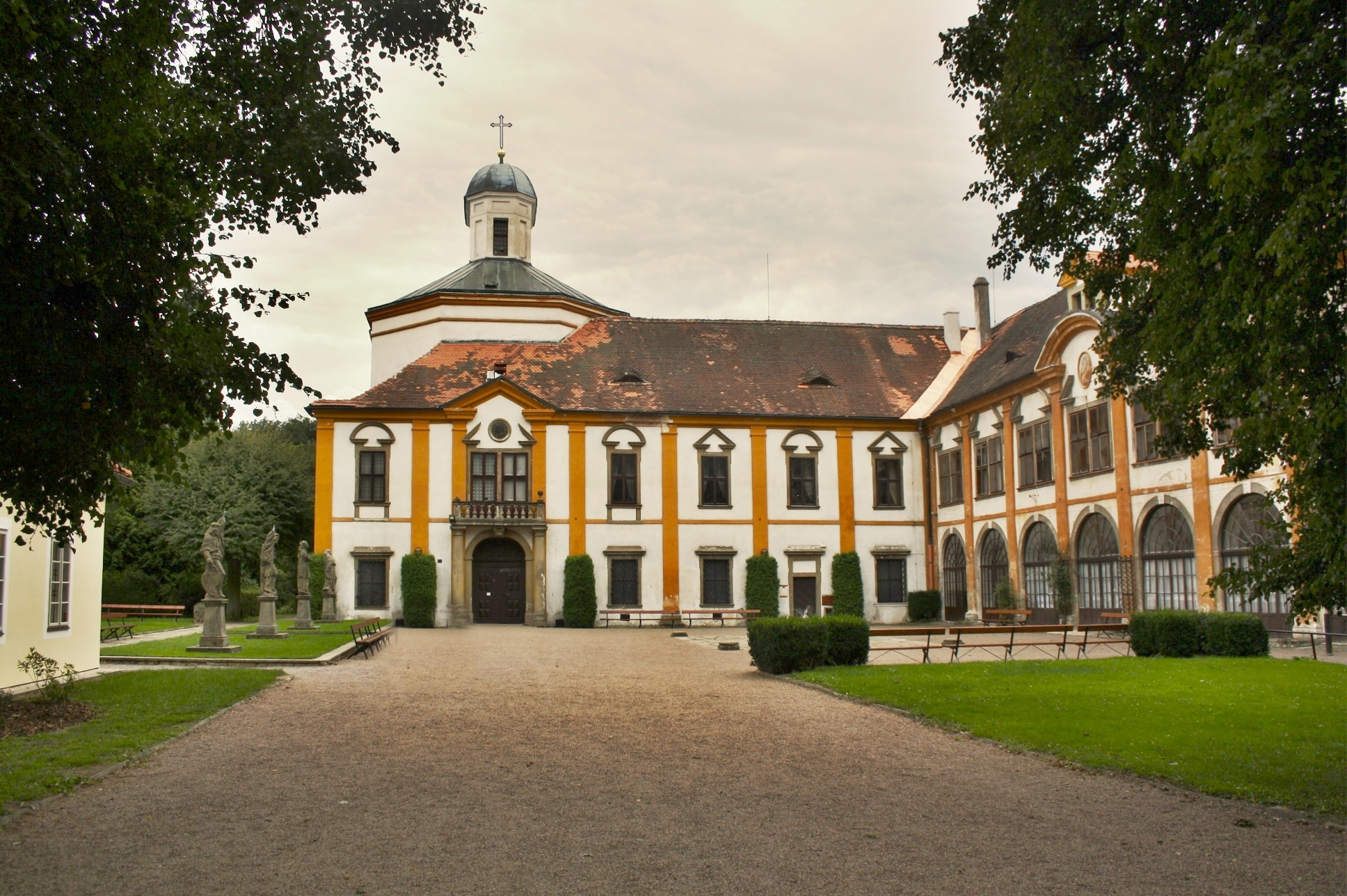
Choltice castle

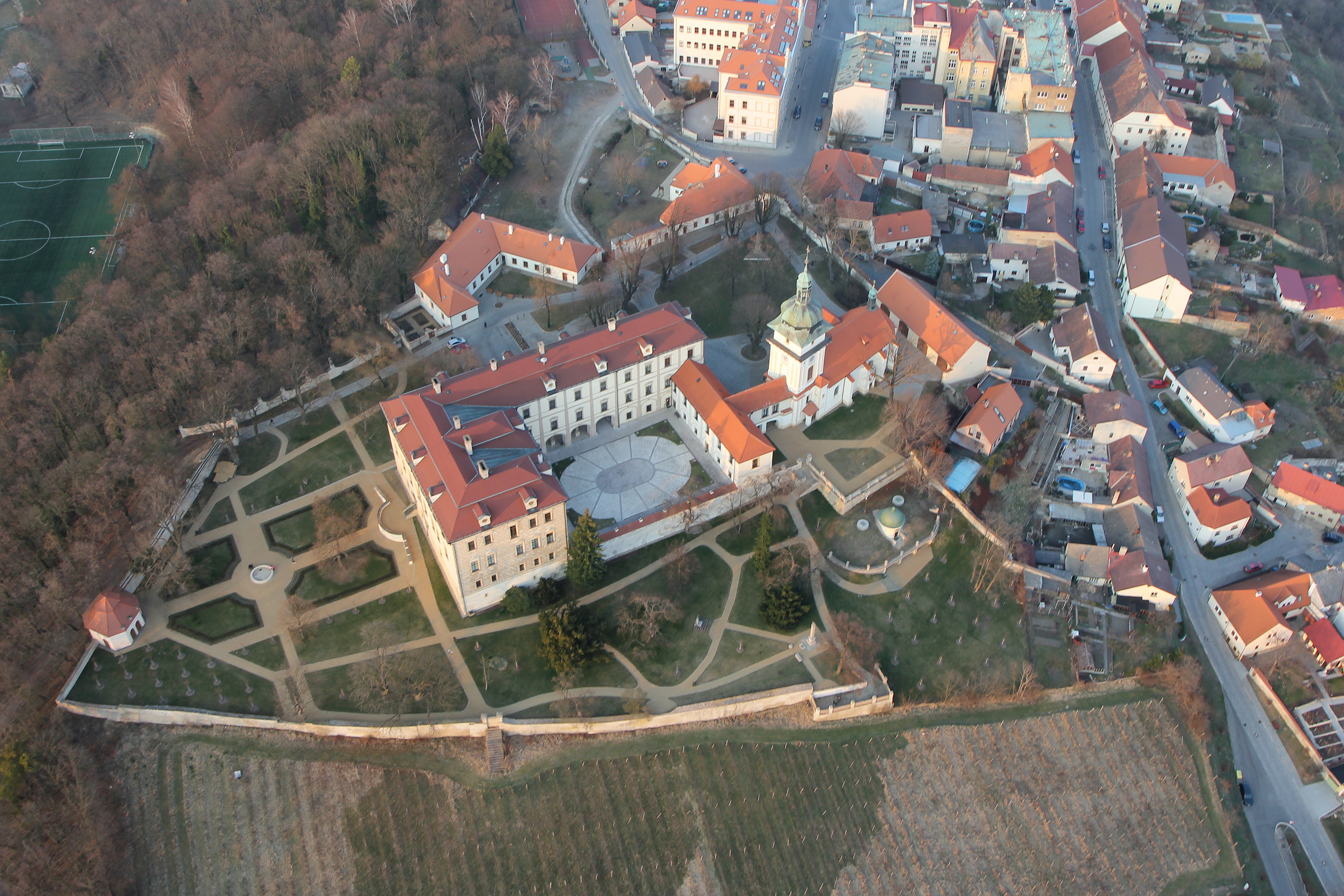
Benátky nad Jizerou castle

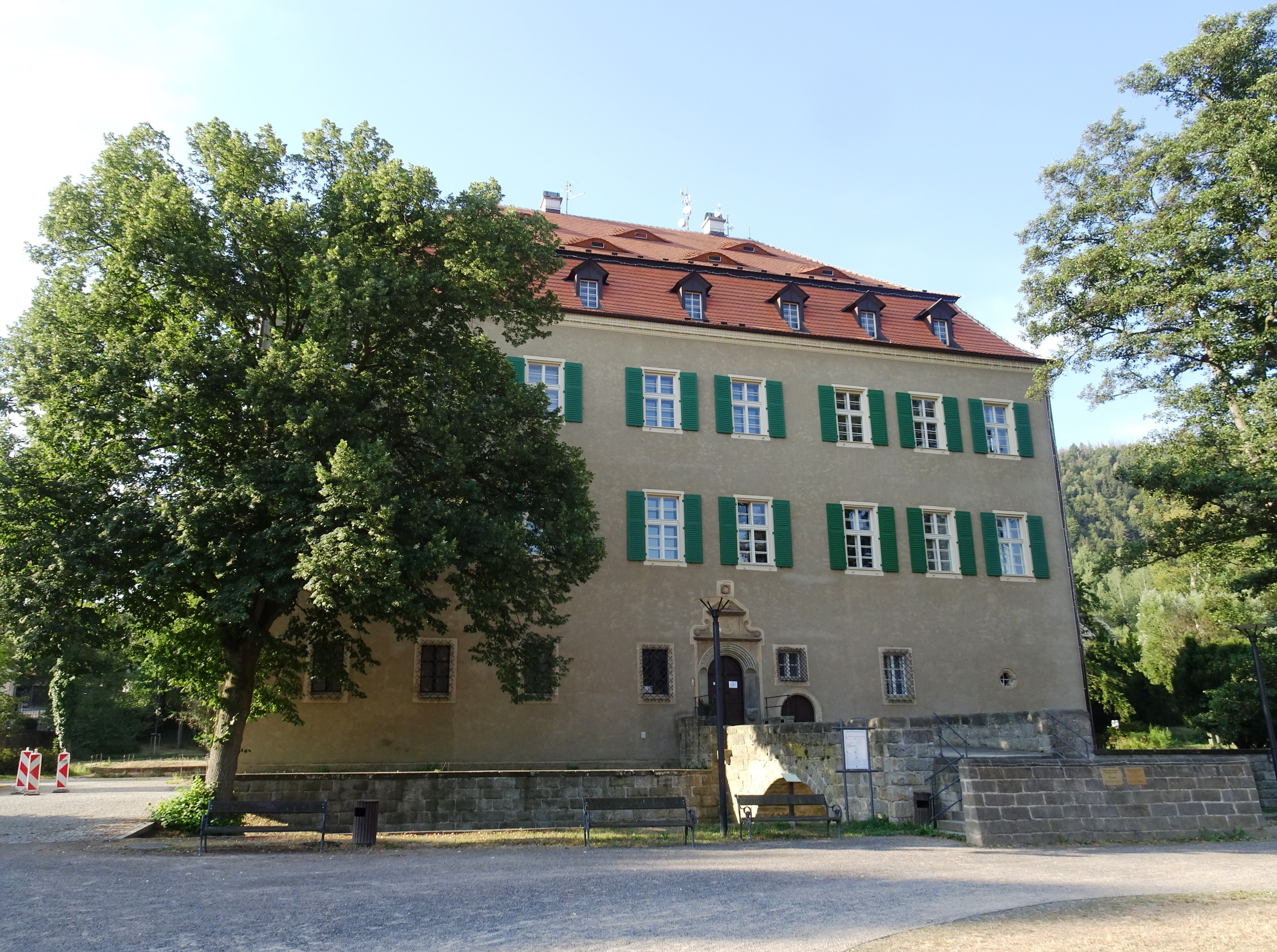
Jílové u Děčína castle

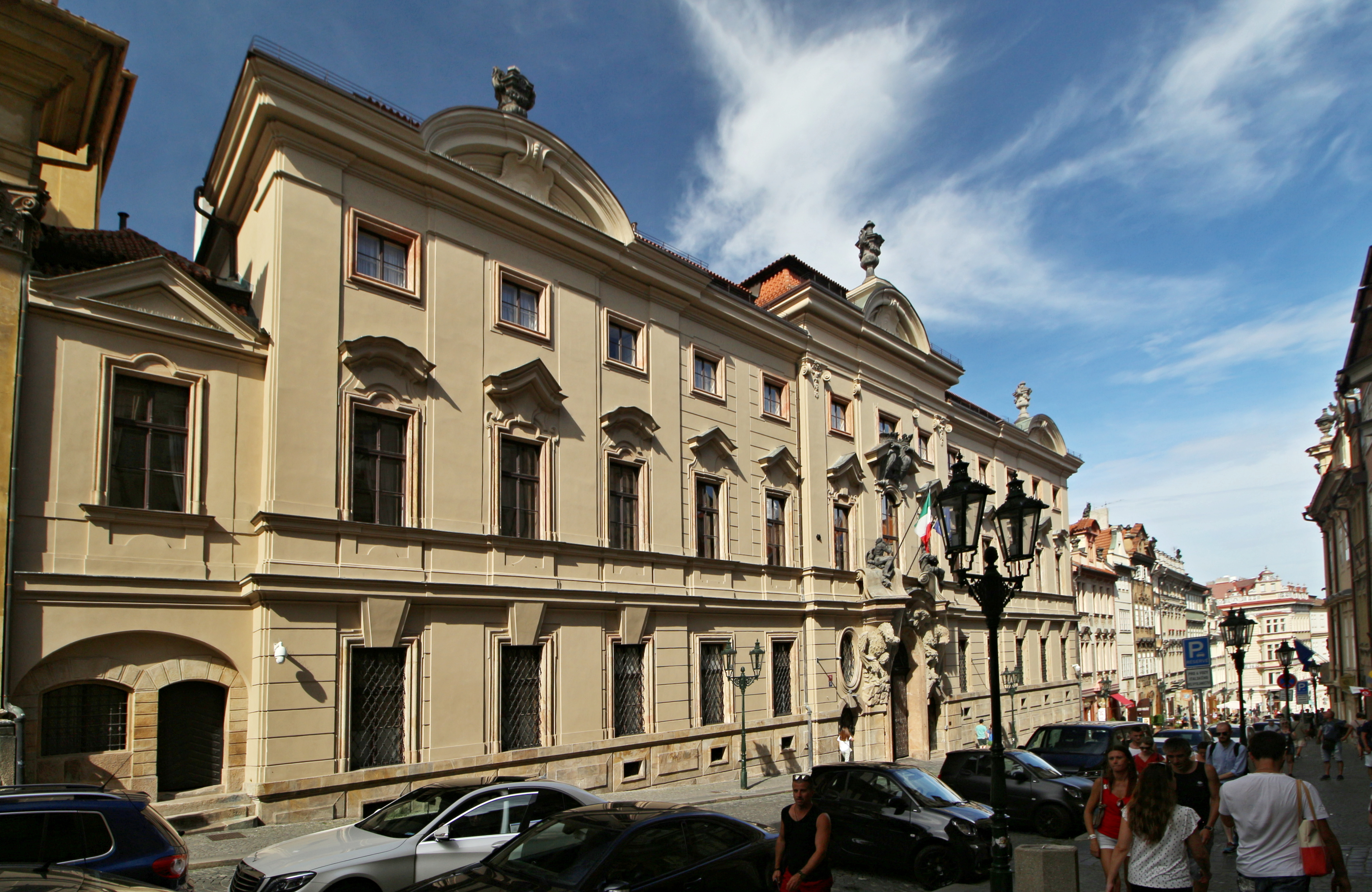
Thun-Hohenstein Palace, Prague (Malá Strana, Nerudova)

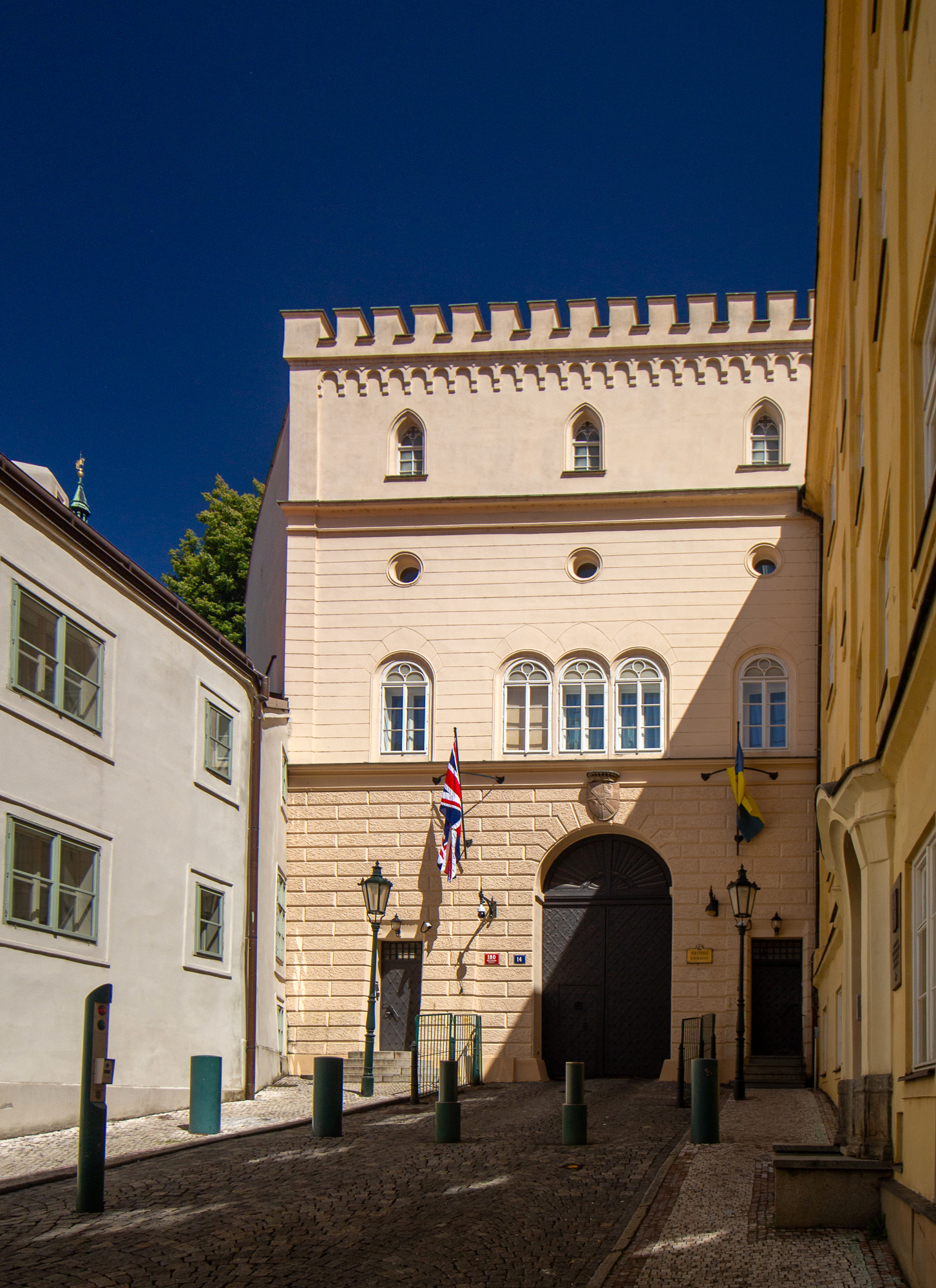
Thun-Palace, Prague (Malá Strana, Thunovská)

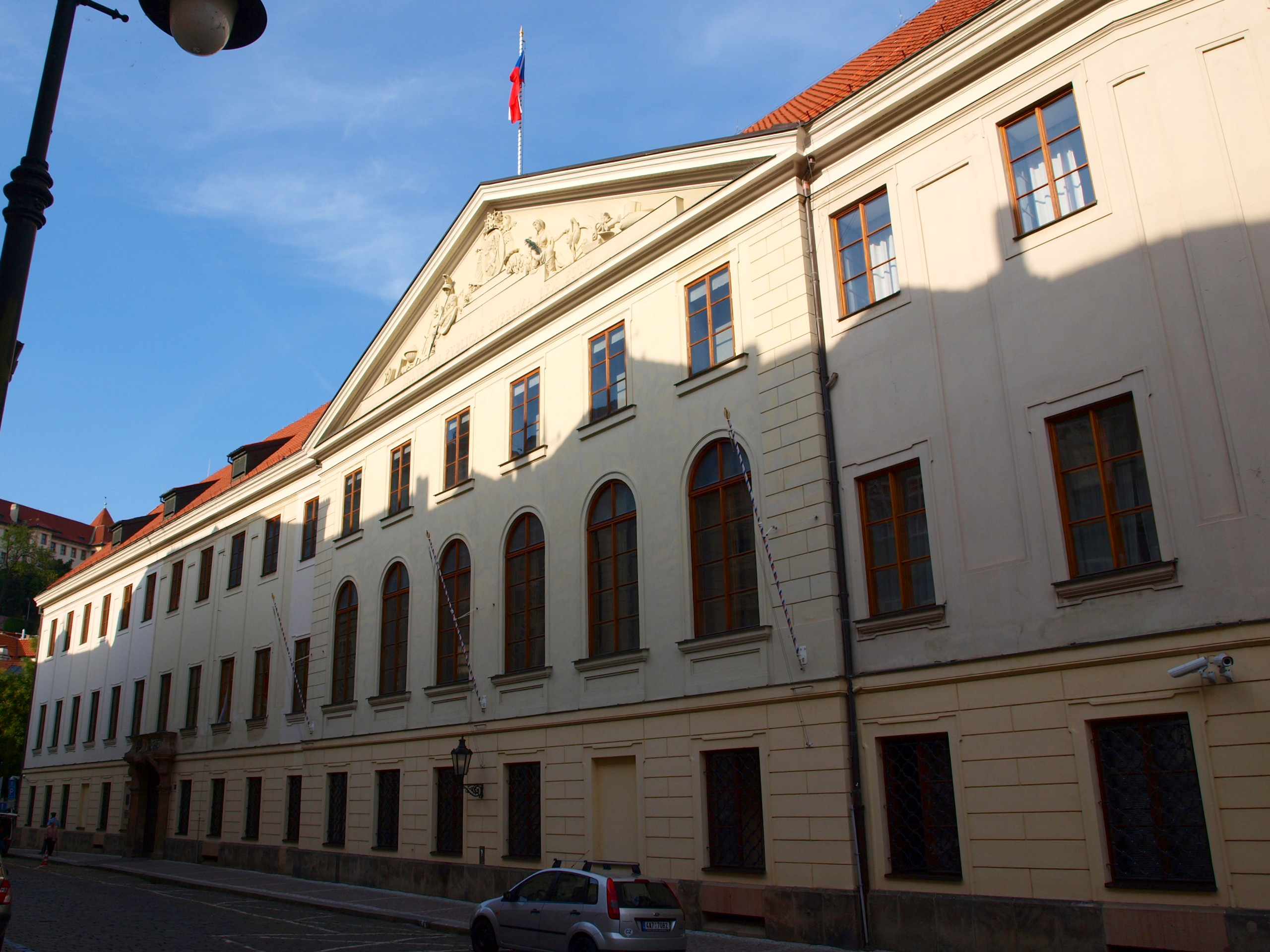
Thun Palace, Prague (Malá Strana, Sněmovní)

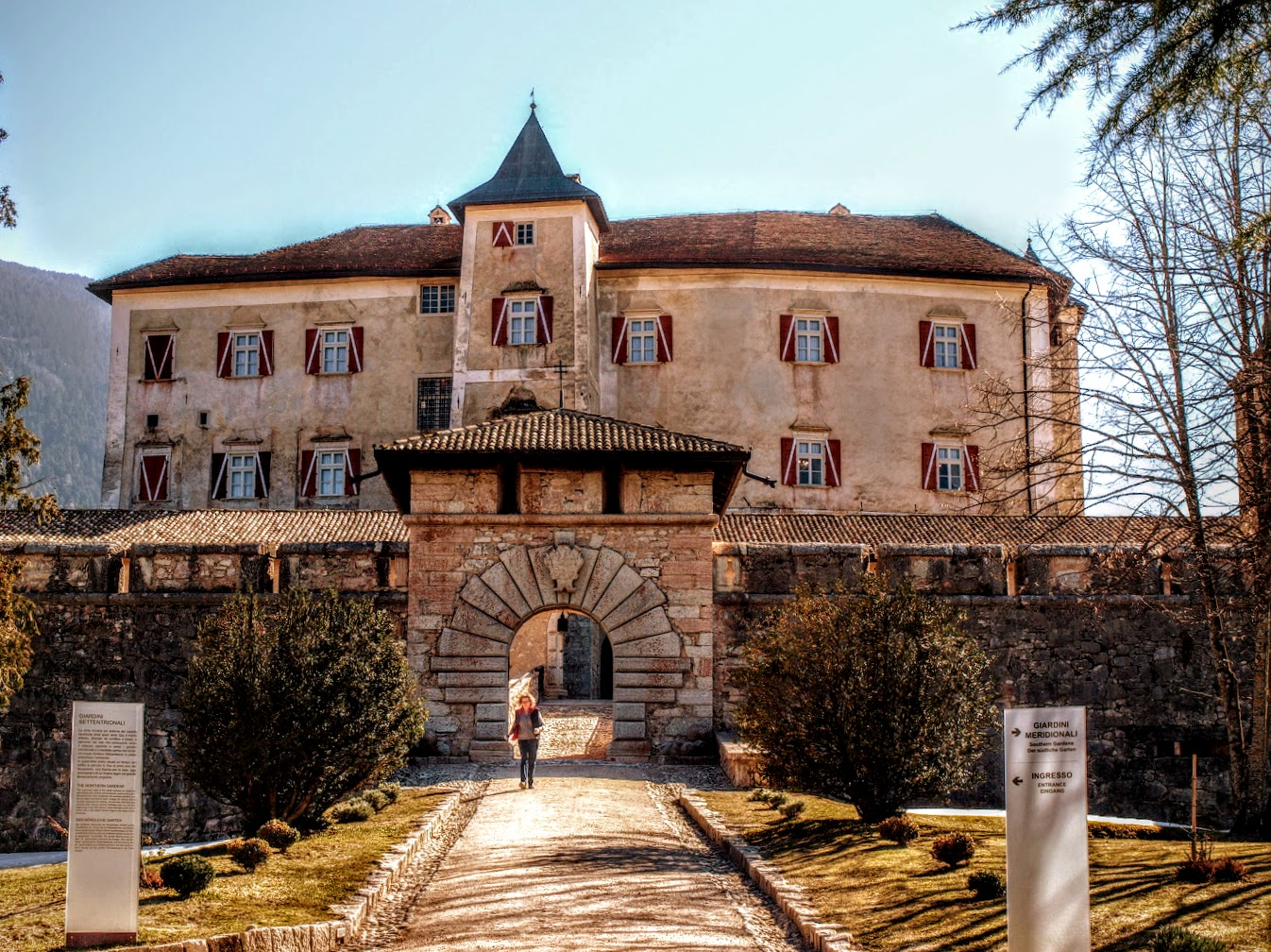
Castel Thun, Trentino, Italy

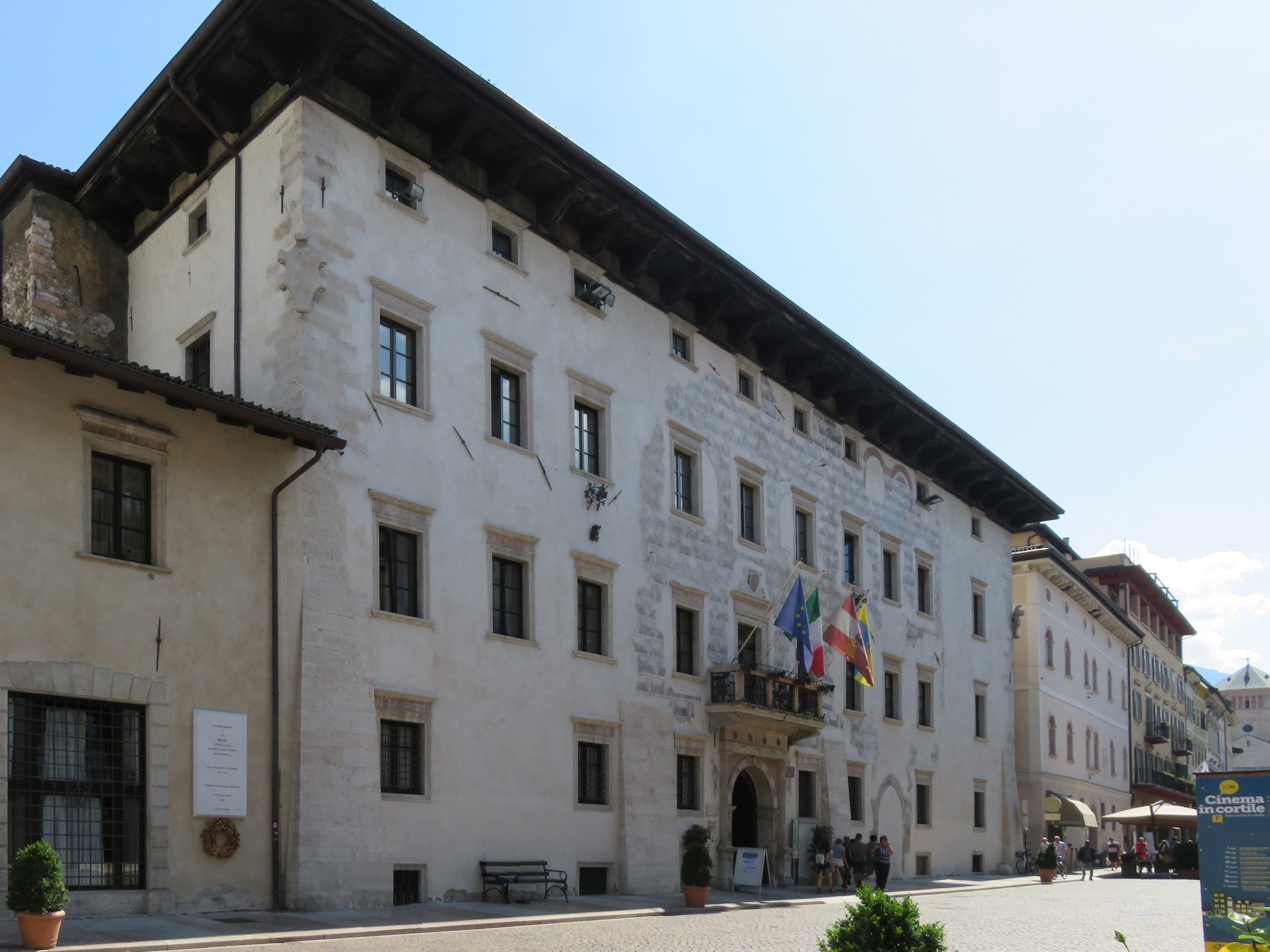
Thun Palace, Trento, Italy
