= Monarchy of Liechtenstein =

Prince of Liechtenstein
- Fürst von und zu Liechtenstein (German)
- Arms of His Serene Highness the Prince of Liechtenstein

Incumbent
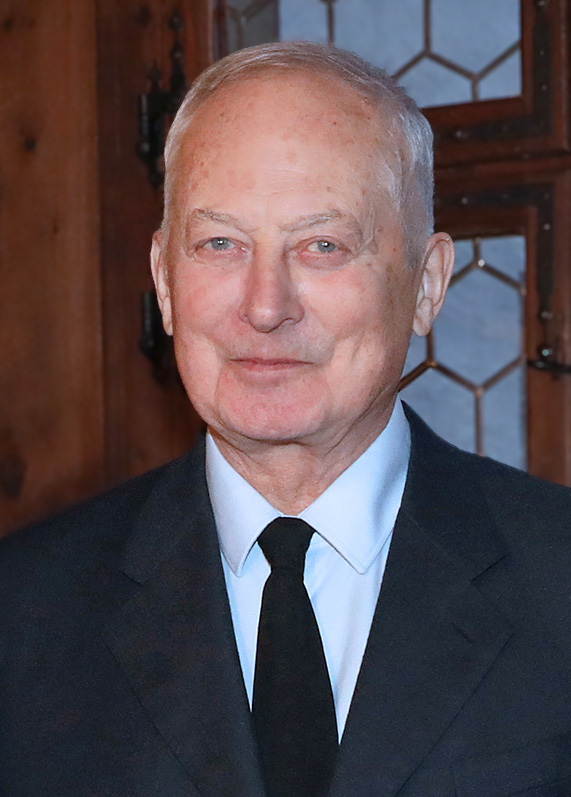
- Hans-Adam II since 13 November 1989

Details
- Style: His Serene Highness
- Heir apparent: Alois
- First monarch: Karl I
- Formed: 20 December 1608; 417 years ago
- Residence: Vaduz Castle

The monarchy of Liechtenstein is the semi-constitutional form of government by which a hereditary sovereign reigns as the head of state of Liechtenstein. The current monarch is Prince Hans-Adam II. The House of Liechtenstein, after which the sovereign principality was named in 1719, hails from Liechtenstein Castle in Lower Austria, which the family possessed from the middle of the twelfth century to the thirteenth century, and from 1807 onward. It was the last European monarchy to practise strict agnatic primogeniture, replacing it with absolute primogeniture in August 2026.

== History ==
Through the centuries, the dynasty acquired vast swathes of land, predominantly in Moravia, Lower Austria, Silesia, and Styria, though in all cases, these territories were held in fief under other more senior feudal lords, particularly under various lines of the Habsburg family, to whom several Liechtenstein princes served as close advisors.

Without any territory held immediately from the Imperial crown, the Liechtenstein family, although noble, did not qualify for a seat in the Diet of the Holy Roman Empire. By purchase in 1699 and 1712 from the counts of Waldburg-Zeil-Hohenems of, respectively, the small lordship of Schellenberg and the county of Vaduz, the Liechtensteins acquired immediate lands within the Holy Roman Empire which made them eligible for elevation to the Imperial Diet. Thereby, on 23 January 1719, Emperor Charles VI decreed Vaduz and Schellenberg were henceforth united and raised to the status of a Fürstentum (principality) under the name "Liechtenstein" for "[his] true servant, Anton Florian of Liechtenstein".

Although the family continued to own larger territories in various parts of central and eastern Europe, it was in right of Liechtenstein's status as an Imperial Estate that the family of wealthy noble Austrian courtiers became a dynasty of imperial princes, continuing to dwell in the imperial capital of Vienna or on their larger estates elsewhere, not taking up permanent residence in their principality for more than 300 years, moving into their Alpine realm only in 1938, after dissolution of both the Holy Roman Empire and Austria-Hungary.

== Powers ==
The prince of Liechtenstein has broad powers, which include the appointment of judges, the dismissal of ministers or government, veto power, and the calling of referendums. The 2003 referendum was a proposal put forth by Prince Hans-Adam II to revise parts of the Constitution, on the one hand expanding the monarch's power with the authority to veto legislation, while on the other hand securing for the citizenry the option to abolish the monarchy by vote at any time without being subject to princely veto. The right of the parishes that make up the principality to secede was simultaneously recognised.

Prince Hans-Adam II had warned that he and his family would move to Austria if the referendum were rejected. Despite opposition from Mario Frick, a former Liechtenstein prime minister, the referendum was approved by the electorate in 2003. Opponents accused Hans-Adam of engaging in emotional blackmail to achieve his goal and constitutional experts from the Council of Europe branded the event as a retrograde move. A proposal to revoke the prince's new veto powers was rejected by 76% of voters in a 2012 referendum. On 15 August 2004 Prince Hans-Adam II formally delegated most of his sovereign authority (regency) to his son and heir-apparent, the Hereditary Prince Alois, as a way of transitioning to a new generation. Formally, Hans-Adam remains head of state.

== Compensation ==
The prince receives an untaxed salary of 250,000 Swiss francs (234,000 euros or 252,000 US dollars).

== Succession ==
Succession to the Liechtensteiner throne follows absolute primogeniture, as laid down by the house law since 2026.

== Titles ==
According to their house law, the monarch bears the titles:

Reigning Prince of Liechtenstein, Duke of Troppau and Jägerndorf, Count of Rietberg, Sovereign of the House of Liechtenstein.

== Princely standard ==
Current personal standard of the Prince of Liechtenstein, adopted in 1982

Personal standard of the Prince of Liechtenstein from 1957 until 1982

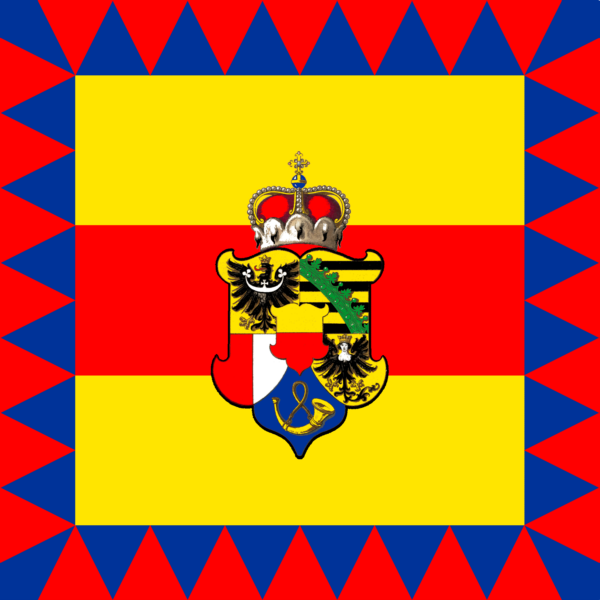
Former Princely Standard as it appeared in 1912

== See also ==
- Ducal hat of Liechtenstein
- List of monarchs of Liechtenstein
