= 1911 in British music =

This is a summary of 1911 in music in the United Kingdom.

== Events ==
- 24 May – Edward Elgar conducts the première of his second symphony in front of a smaller-than-expected audience at the Queen's Hall, London.
- June – Edward Elgar is appointed to the Order of Merit by King George V
- 21 June – Sergei Diaghilev's Ballet Russes begins its first London season at Covent Garden. Dancers Vaslav Nijinsky, Tamara Karsavina, Adolph Bolm and others perform Le Pavillon d'Armide, Carnival and Prince Igor.
- 22 June – At the Coronation of King George V and Queen Mary, Sir Frederick Bridge, as Director of Music, seeks to cover four hundred years of British music, Works by Thomas Tallis, John Merbecke and George Frederick Handel are included, alongside new works by Sir Hubert Parry (a new orchestral introduction for his setting of Psalm 122, "I was glad" and a new setting of the Te Deum), Charles Villiers Stanford (a new setting of the Gloria), Elgar (Coronation March), organist Walter Alcock (a new setting of the Sanctus), and Bridge himself.
- 30 June – English pianist Solomon makes his debut at the Queen's Hall in London at the age of eight years old, performing Tchaikovsky's Piano Concerto No. 1.
- July – Frank Bridge completes his orchestral suite The Sea, during a visit to the seaside town of Eastbourne.
- October - The Society of Women Musicians, co-founded by Gertrude Eaton, Marion Scott, Katharine Eggar, and others, holds its first meeting.
- 23 November – Elgar's Symphony no 2, again conducted by the composer, is performed by the Hallé Orchestra, and receives mixed reviews.
- 30 November – Swan Lake is performed for the first time in London by Ballet Russes at Covent Garden.

== Popular music ==
- Harry Lauder - "Roamin' In The Gloamin'"
- Billy Merson
  - "The Photo of the Girl I Left Behind"
  - "The Spaniard That Blighted My Life"

== Classical music: new works ==
- Granville Bantock – Dante and Beatrice, symphonic poem
- George Butterworth – Two English Idylls
- Frank Bridge – The Sea
- Eric Coates – Miniature Suite
- Frederick Delius
  - A Song of the High Hills
  - Summer Night on the River
- Edward Elgar
  - Coronation March
  - Symphony No. 2 in Eb, Op. 63
- Gustav Holst – Second Suite in F, for military band
- Roger Quilter – Where the Rainbow Ends (incidental music for the play)
- Ethel Smyth – The March of the Women
- Charles Villiers Stanford
  - Symphony No. 7 in D minor, Op. 124
  - Piano Concerto No. 2 in C minor, Op. 126

== Opera ==
- The Count of Luxembourg, based on the music of Franz Lehár's German operetta Der Graf von Luxemburg (1909), with English lyrics and libretto by Basil Hood and Adrian Ross.

== Musical theatre ==
- 4 March – Peggy, with music by Leslie Stuart, book by George Grossmith, Jr., and lyrics by C. H. Bovill, starring Edmund Payne, Phyllis Dare and Gabrielle Ray, opens at the Gaiety Theatre, London, where it will run for 270 performances.

== Births ==
- 24 January
  - Evelyn Barbirolli, oboist (died 2008)
  - Muir Mathieson, conductor and composer (died 1975)
- 9 June – Frederick May, Irish composer (died 1985)
- 27 August – Kay Walsh, dancer and actress (d. 2005)
- 25 December – Eric Gilder, musicologist (died 2000)
- 27 December – Anna Russell, singer and comedian (died 2006)
- 28 December – Max Jaffa, violinist and bandleader (died 1991)
- date unknown - Gladys Midgley (née Vernon), pianist and singer (died 2005)

== Deaths ==
- 4 May – Ronald Richardson Potter, organist and composer, 31
- 29 May – W. S. Gilbert, lyricist (Savoy operas), 74
- 13 June – Patrick Heeney, Irish composer, 29
- 29 August – Hildegard Werner, Swedish-born musical conductor, 77
- 13 October – Harry Rickards, English-born baritone, comedian and theatre owner, 67 (apoplexy)

== See also ==
- 1919 in the United Kingdom
