= Fischhof =

Fischhof is a surname. Notable people with the surname include:

- Adolf Fischhof (1816–1893), Hungarian-Austrian writer and politician
- Robert Fischhof (1856–1918), Austrian composer
- Joseph Fischhof (1804–1857), Austrian composer
