= Kathleen Richards =

English translator, musicologist, composer and pianist

Kathleen Dale née Richards (29 June 1895, London – March 3, 1984, Woking) was an English composer, pianist, musicologist and translator. She used the name Kathleen Richards for her compositions, but from 1921 used her married name Kathleen Dale for recitals, broadcasts and authorship until the end of her life.

== Early life and marriage ==
Kathleen Richards was educated at St Felix School in Southwold, Suffolk. She studied piano privately with York Bowen from 1914 and later (from 1924) with Fanny Davies. She also studied composition privately with Benjamin Dale from 1914. In 1916 she performed her Pastoral with the American violinist Olga Rudge, who became a lifelong friend. York Bowen included some of her songs (sung by his wife Sylvia) in an Aeolian Hall recital on July 4, 1916, and he performed her short piano piece A Dance in Spring at the same venue on 14 March 1919.

She became Kathleen Dale by marriage to her former teacher, the pianist and composer Benjamin Dale, in 1921. They sometimes performed as a piano duet. The marriage ended in separation in 1930. She studied Swedish at University College, London (1926–28) and taught harmony and music theory at the Matthay School from 1925 to 1931. Richards was a regular performer in broadcast concerts between 1927 and 1931. She became a tutor and lecturer on musical appreciation at the Worker's Educational Association from the 1940s and was as also a member of the Society of Women Musicians.

== Composer and author ==
As a composer, her Minuet, Gavotte and Fugue for small orchestra was included in a Patron's Fund rehearsal at the Royal College of Music with Adrian Boult in 1923. But most of her surviving works are single movement chamber pieces, piano suites and part songs. Christopher Foreman picks out the two suites, Versailles (1920) and Greek Myths (1921), which he describes as "attractive pieces, well conceived for piano, with a polished feeling for harmony, akin to Bowen". A performance of Dance in Spring by Eunmi Ko is currently the only example of her music available as a recording.

Under the name Kathleen Dale, she published two books, including a biography of Johannes Brahms in 1970 and a number of professional articles on music and music history, including entries on Swedish music for Grove's Dictionary (5th Edition). For the 'Symposium' series (edited by Gerald Abraham) she wrote chapters on the keyboard music of Handel, Schubert, Schumann and Grieg. As a scholar and editor she was the first to publish a "complete" version of Schubert's Piano Sonata in E minor (D.566) in 1948.

== Later career ==
While staying at her parents' house in Woking (Fir Ridge, Hook Heath), she was for a time a close neighbour of Dame Ethel Smyth, visiting her in the months before Smyth's death in 1944. As a result she was appointed Smyth's musical executor and produced a study of her works. In 1953 Richards also helped the musicologist Marion Scott complete her work on the Haydn Catalogue after Scott had been diagnosed with terminal colon cancer.

Richards returned to live in Southwold (at 9b, Lorne Road) in the 1960s, and later lived in Addlestone, Surrey. She died in Woking at the age of 88. In The Times, Derek Melville talked of her formidable knowledge of languages, and wrote: "her diminutive stature seems to have acted as a spur to her achievement and she commanded a rare intellectual authority".

== Selected works ==
- Armies in the Fire, song, text Robert Louis Stevenson
- Dance in Spring for piano, op. 3 (c 1919, published by Ascherberg, Hopwood & Crew)
- The Flight, unison or two part song (1949, published by OUP)
- Two Pieces, for piano (published Augener, 1948)
  - 'Frozen Landscape'
  - 'Whither'
- Greek Myths for piano, op. 7 (1921)
  - 'Echo'
  - 'Ganymede'
  - 'Lethe'
- The Horn, part song (1947)
- Minuet, Gavotte and Fugue for small orchestra (1923)
- Music for piano op. 22
- Music for Two, two pianos (1934)
  - 'Sprite'
  - 'Starry Silence'
  - 'Bells'
  - 'Homage'
  - 'Tambura'
- Pastoral for violin and piano (1916)
- Six Duets for two violins, teacher and pupil
- Two Divertimenti for two violins (1940)
- Versailles for piano, op. 2 (1920)
- Wayfaring for violin and piano (1939)
- The Window, part song (1947)
- Winter, part song (1948)

=== Books and articles published ===
- Hours with Dominico Scarlatti, in Music & Letters, Vol. XXII, Issue 2, April 1941, pp. 115–122
- Hans Redlich, Monteverdi: Life and Works (1952), translated by Kathleen Dale
- Nineteenth Century Piano Music - A Handbook for Pianists, Oxford University Press (1954)
- C. Saint John. Ethel Smyth: A Biography (with additional chapters by V. Sackville-West and Kathleen Dale (London: Longmans, Green & Co., 1959)
- Brahms: a concertgoer's companion. Clive Bingley (1970)
