= Peter Pokorny =

Peter Pokorny may refer to:

- Peter Pokorny (official) (1795–1866), Austrian civil servant and Landvogt of Liechtenstein
- Peter Pokorný (footballer) (born 2001), Slovak association footballer
- Peter Pokorny (tennis) (born 1940), Austrian tennis player
