= Kalitha Dorothy Fox =

English composer and author

Kalitha Dorothy Fox (1894 – 11 August 1934) was an English composer. She was born in London to wealthy parents. Her mother died in 1905, and a year later, aged 11, she composed the solo piano piece Affliction – on the death of my mother, which was published by Augener. The arrangement - credited to 'L.L' - may have been by Liza Lehmann.

A set of her mature compositions was published by Maurice Senart in the 1920s and 1930s, and there were occasional performances - her Suite for String Orchestra was heard in London in 1925, her substantial Piano Trio (lasting 40 minutes) was performed at a Society of Women Musicians concert at 74 Grosvenor Street, London on 10 July 1926, and her Viola Sonata was broadcast from Bournemouth on 21 November 1927. Another trio, for flute, viola and piano, was performed at Grosvenor Street on 9 July, 1932. There are modern recordings of her Chant Élégiaque, op. 6 for cello and piano, and of her Viola Sonata, op, 7.

Fox suffered from ill-health and a nervous disposition throughout her life. She had a London address in Hyde Park Square, spent some time in France, and from the mid-1920s until her death lived at Windsor House, Amersham with her friend, the novelist Christabel Lowndes-Yates (1880-1966). A concert of her music was given in London about a month before her death.

She committed suicide at the age of 40 at the White Hart Hotel in Windsor, having left the house at Amersham apparently upset by the noise of road drilling outside. A number of half-finished manuscripts were found in her luggage. The death and inquest received considerable attention in the newspapers. Her estate was valued at £13,635. A Phantasy Quartet was performed as a tribute a year after her death.

== Selected works ==
Chamber music

- Scherzo in C for violin and piano, op. 4 (published 1910)
- Chant Élégiaque for cello and piano, op. 6 (published 1921)
- Suite for string orchestra (performed 1925, presumed lost)
- Sonata in C minor for viola and piano, op. 7 (ca. 1925)
- Trio for piano, violin and cello (performed 1926, presumed lost)
- Sonata for violin and piano (published 1931)
- Trio for flute, viola and piano (performed 1932)
- Phantasy Quartet (posthumous performance, 1935)

Piano

- Affliction: On the Death of My Mother (published 1906); arrangement by L. L.
- Fantasie in C♯ minor, op. 2 (published 1910)
- Minuet in G minor, op. 3 (published 1910)
- The Kitten Scherzo, op. 8 (published 1929)
- Prélude, op. 9 (1925?)
- Five Pieces, op. 11 (1925?)
