= Johann Kaspar Laaba =

Landvogt of Liechtenstein from 1748 to 1751

Landvogt of Liechtenstein
- In office 4 February 1748 – 1751
- Monarch: Johann Nepomuk Karl
- Preceded by: Anton Bauer
- Succeeded by: Franz Karl von Grillot

Personal details
- Spouse: Magdalena Mayer

Johann Kaspar Laaba was the Landvogt of Liechtenstein from 1748 to 1751.

He was from Hüfingen and studied law in Freiburg and Breisgau. He was a court councillor of the Margraviate of Baden, a legal council in Zell am Harmersbach, and also a court councillor to the court of the Hohenzollern-Hechingen. He was appointed as the Landvogt of Liechtenstein on 4 February 1748, although he was considered unremarkable and was dismissed from office three years later in 1751 and was succeeded by Franz Karl von Grillot.

He was later a court councillor at Einsiedeln Abbey in Switzerland and then at Schuttern Abbey in Friesenheim. He died at some point after 1756.
