= Alma Haas =

German pianist and musicologist

- Born: Alma Hollaender; 31 January 1847; Silesia
- Died: 12 December 1932 (aged 85); London, England
- Occupations: Pianist, musicologist, teacher
- Organization: Society of Women Musicians
- Spouse: Dr. Ernst Haas (1872–1882)

Alma Haas (31 January 1847 – 12 December 1932) was a German pianist, musicologist, and teacher. She was a founding member and third president of the Society of Women Musicians.

== Life ==
Alma Haas was born Alma Hollaender in Silesia, today part of Poland. She was the daughter of music teacher Isaac Hollaender (1809–1898) and Rosalie Pappenheim (1814–1882), a pianist. At ten years old, she went to music school, and made her first public performance at 14, with Mendelssohn's Piano Concerto in G minor. In 1862, she followed her eldest brother, the composer and pianist Alexis Hollaender to Berlin, where he had been studying. She continued her studies there from 1862 to 1867, and the following year performed at Leipzig's Gewandhaus. She toured the major German cities, and in 1870 played a season in London.

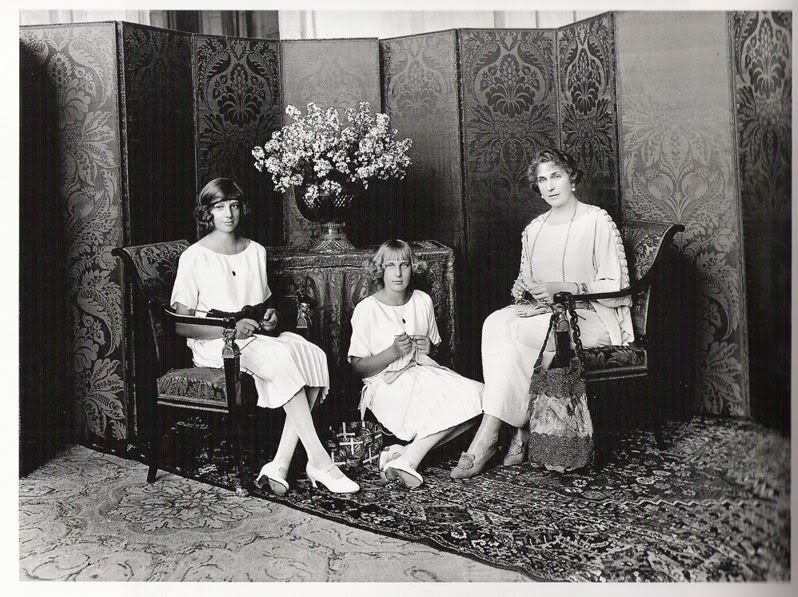
Queen Victoria Eugenie with her daughters Princess Beatriz and Princess Cristina, to whom Haas gave pianoforte lessons.

In 1872, she married Dr. Ernst Haas, a professor of Sanskrit at University College London. They had two children: Elsa (b.1876) and Paul (b. 1878). On Ernst Haas' death in 1882, Alma Haas donated her husband's book collections to SOAS University of London. Between 1876 and 1886 she taught at Bedford College, London, as well as at the Royal College of Music. Among her pupils was Liza Lehmann. In 1886 she became head of the music department at King's College London. In 1922, she gave a pianoforte lesson to Infanta Beatriz and Infanta María Cristina of Spain, in the presence of their mother, the Queen of Spain.

As a performer, Haas was described as 'quiet' and 'artistic', The Times noting in 1911 that she:

is never content with the stereotyped programme that critics know so well and dislike to intensely; her choice of pieces is always interesting, and she presents them always in a fresh light and as if she were enjoying them as much as any one.

She earned a reputation as an 'outstanding Beethoven interpreter', and was noted for her broad repertoire. After 1914, Haas largely ceased her concert career, but continued to teach. In that year, she became the third president of the Society of Women Musicians, of which she had been a founding member.

Alma Haas died at home on 12 December 1932.
