= Goatley =

Goatley is a surname of English origin. Notable people with this surname include:

- Alma Goatley (1887–1969), English composer
- David Goatley (born 1954), Canadian portrait painter
- David Emmanuel Goatley (born 1961), American theologian
- Richard Goatley (born 1974), English cricket administrator

== See also ==
- Goatley boat
