= Rudolf Lehmann (artist) =

German painter (1819–1905)

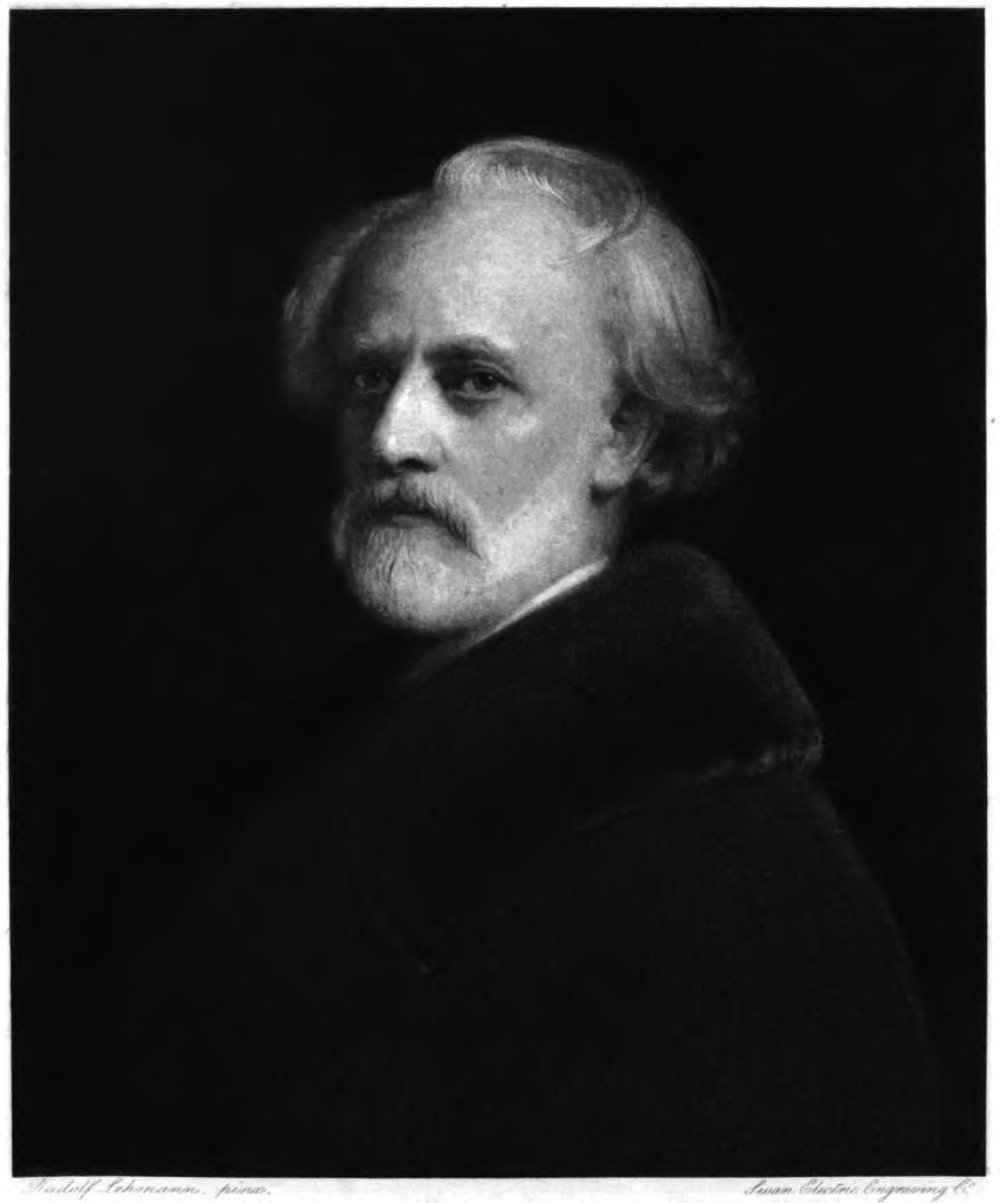
- Self-portrait, circa 1896
- Born: 19 August 1819; Ottensen, Duchy of Holstein
- Died: 27 October 1905 (aged 86); Bushey, Hertfordshire, England
- Resting place: Highgate Cemetery, London
- Spouse: Amelia Chambers (m. 1861)
- Relatives: Henri Lehmann (brother); Frederick Lehmann (brother); Liza Lehmann (daughter); Rudolf Chambers Lehmann (nephew)
- Known for: portraiture

Wilhelm August Rudolf Lehmann (19 August 1819, near Hamburg – 27 October 1905, in Bushey) was a German-born British portraitist and author. He moved to the United Kingdom in 1866.

== Life ==
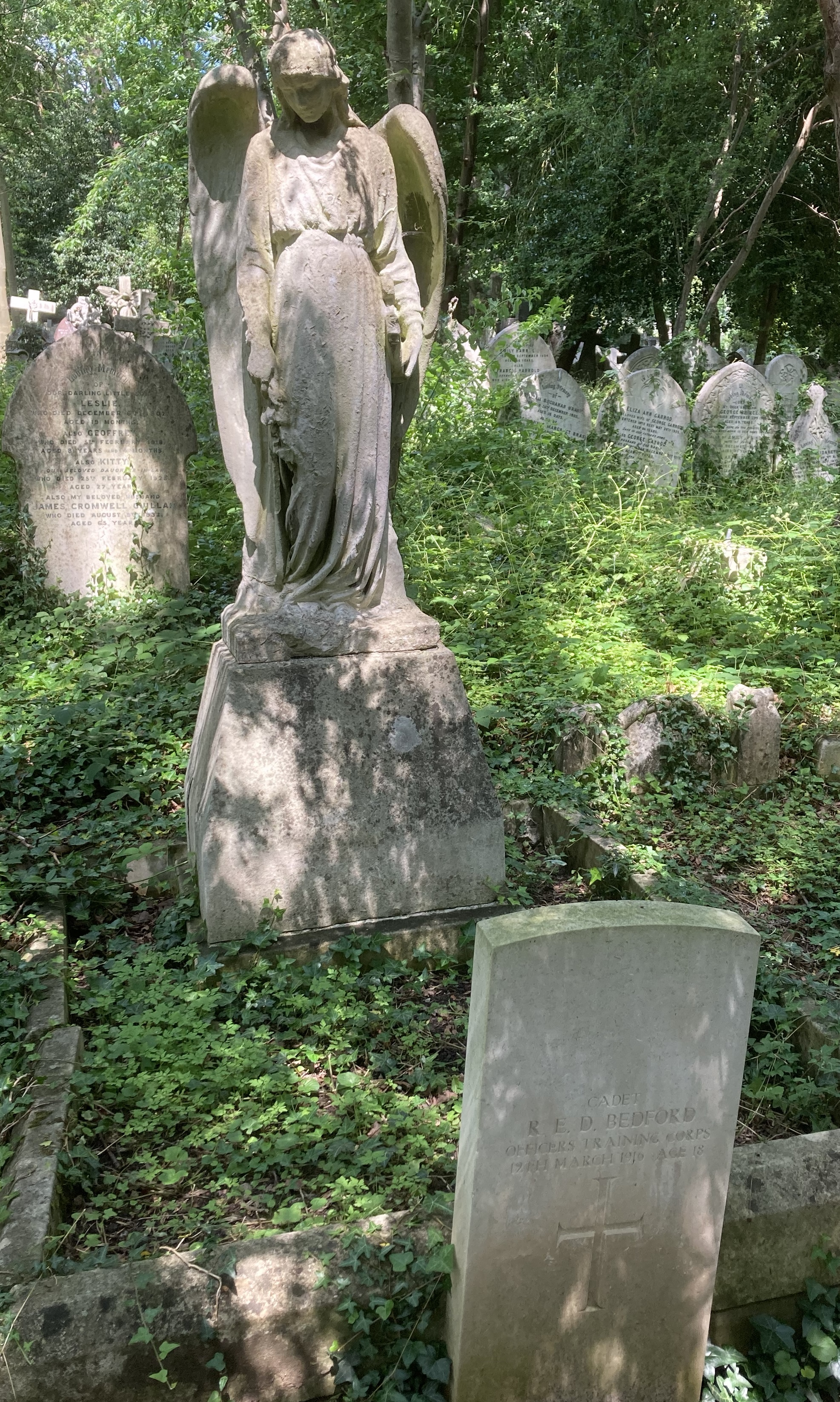
The Lehmann family grave in Highgate Cemetery

Lehmann was born in Ottensen (now part of Hamburg) in the Duchy of Holstein, the son of painter Leo Lehmann. The Lehmann family was Jewish. He and his elder brother Henri Lehmann studied in Paris at the École des Beaux-arts, in Rome, and with the painters Peter von Cornelius and Wilhelm von Kaulbach. Lehmann's major painting, The Blessing of the Pontine Marshes by Sixtus V was shown in Paris in 1846 and bought by the French government.

In 1866 Lehmann settled in London, became a British citizen, and painted his best-known portraits.

He married Amelia Chambers, daughter of the Scot author and naturalist Robert Chambers. Amelia's sister Nina married Lehmann's younger brother Frederick, and the extended social circle of the two couples included Charles Dickens, George Eliot, Robert Browning, Lord Leighton, and other prominent figures.

In 1896, a number of his engraved portraits were collected and published as Men and Women of the Century. Lehmann's memoir was published in 1894 as An Artist's Reminiscences.

He died at his home, Boumemede, Bushey, on 27 October 1905 and was buried in the east side of Highgate Cemetery. His daughter, Liza was later buried with him.

== Family ==
One of Lehmann's daughters was Liza Lehmann, who became a notable English soprano and composer. Lehmann was the uncle of the British journalist and politician Rudolf Chambers Lehmann.

== Gallery ==
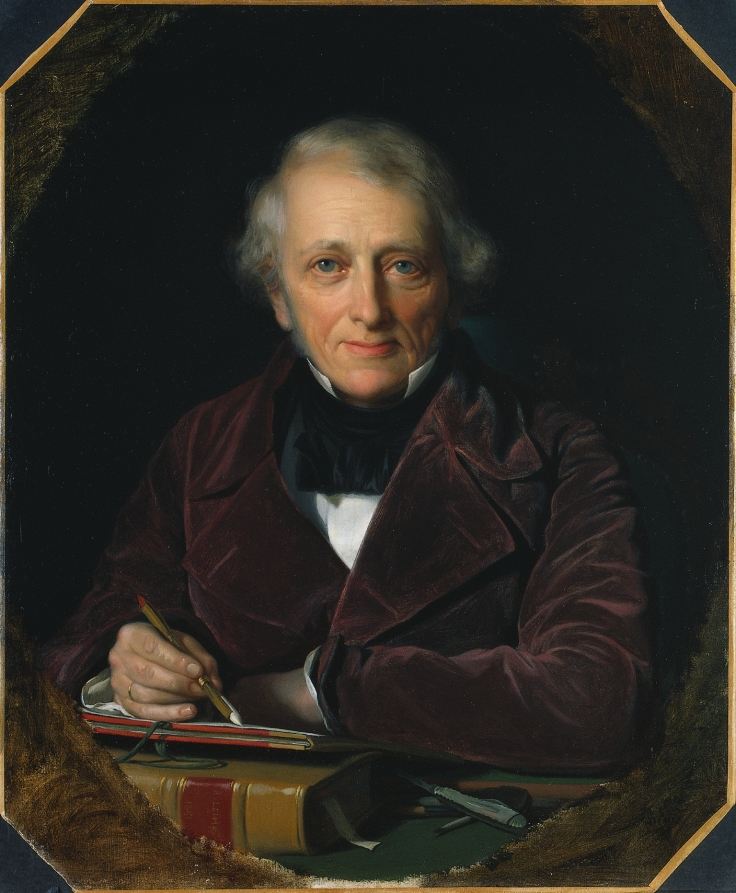
Rudolf Lehmann, Leo Lehmann (1851; Cleveland Museum of Art). Portrait of the artist's father.

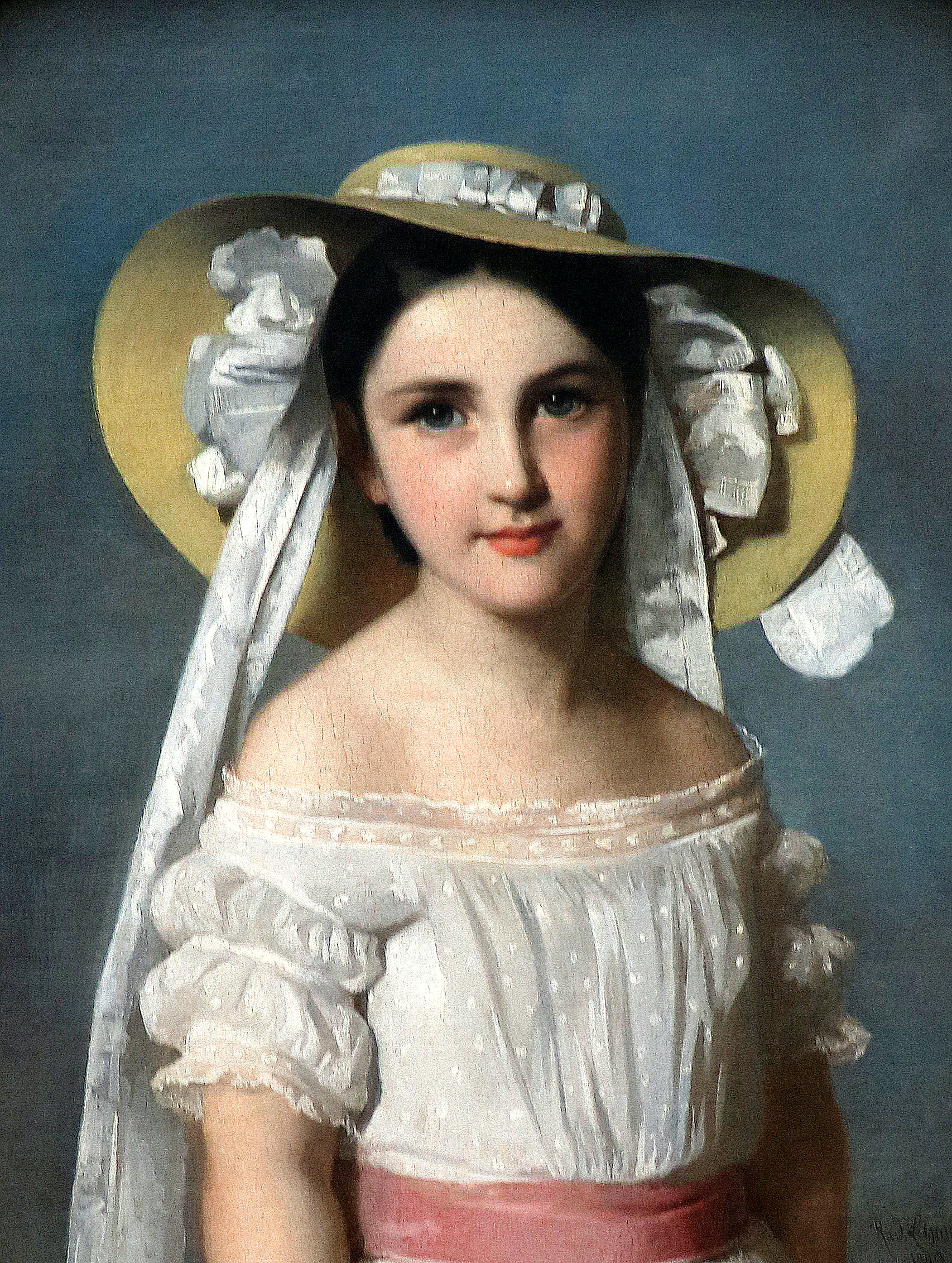
Portrait of Miss Emily Leo by Wilhelm August Rudolf Lehmann (1849). Musée d’arts de Nantes, France
