= Michael Menzinger =

Governor of Liechtenstein from 1848 to 1861

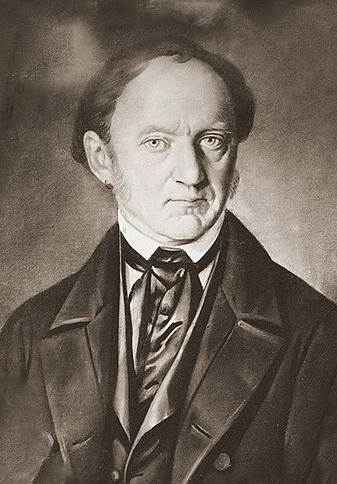

Governor of Liechtenstein
- In office 1848 – 15 March 1861
- Monarchs: Aloys II; Johann II
- Preceded by: Himself (as Landvogt)
- Succeeded by: Karl Freiherr Haus von Hausen

Landvogt of Liechtenstein
- In office 22 March 1833 – 1848
- Monarchs: Johann I Joseph; Aloys II
- Preceded by: Peter Pokorny
- Succeeded by: Himself (as governor)

Personal details
- Born: 2 December 1792 Vaduz, Liechtenstein
- Died: 5 September 1877 (aged 84) Überlingen, German Empire
- Profession: Civil servant

Johann Michael Menzinger (2 December 1792 – 5 September 1877) was a Liechtensteiner civil servant. He governed Liechtenstein for 28 years, originally as the Landvogt from 1833 to 1848, and then as the first governor from 1848 to 1861.

== Early life ==
Menzinger was born on 2 December 1792 in Vaduz, Liechtenstein. His father, Franz Xaver Menzinger, served as the Landvogt of Liechtenstein, the de facto head of the country, until 1808. He spent his early years in Vaduz and was friends with Ludwig Grass as he grew up. From 1805 to 1808, he attended grammar school in Feldkirch, the Austrian Empire. Following the death of his father, Menzinger began studying law in Freiburg, where his uncle, Franz Ignaz Menzinger, was a university professor. He was a member of the Rhenania fraternity in Freiburg and also studied in Tübingen, where he was a member of the Suevia fraternity. After his studies, Menzinger enlisted in the Imperial and Royal Army as a military lawyer, holding the position of senior lieutenant-auditor.

== Career ==
In March 1833, Menzinger applied to Prince Johann I Joseph of Liechtenstein to become the bailiff of the country, known as the Landvogt (head of the district office). Until Menzinger applied for the post, the position was initially considered undesirable; Karl Heinz Burmeister, in the Historical Lexicon of the Principality of Liechtenstein, noted that previously, "officials generally viewed their service in Liechtenstein as an exile that they wanted to leave as soon as possible". Menzinger was appointed Landvogt on 22 March 1833 and took office on 5 September 1833, his arrival delayed by illness.

In his tenure as Landvogt, Menzinger oversaw the establishment of an orphanage in 1836 and a fund for people experiencing poverty in 1845, Liechtenstein's first secondary school in 1858, and a law school in 1859. The country's first drainage projects began in 1834; a new police ordinance was enacted in 1843; and a ban on emigration was lifted in 1848. He suggested a customs treaty with Austria to Prince Aloys II; the treaty was signed in 1852, and Burmeister described it as "a crucial prerequisite for the industrialization that began in Liechtenstein in 1861". Under Menzinger, the Canton of St. Gallen and Liechtenstein began constructing embankments in 1848, as flooding of the Rhine had created significant hardship in the country.

During Menzinger's time as Landvogt, the Revolution of 1848 in Liechtenstein occurred. He helped ensure the revolution in Liechtenstein was bloodless and served as a leading member of a council that drafted a new constitution. He and Karl Schädler were the primary drafters of the constitution and were in charge of final editing. As a concession towards the revolution, the district office was disbanded and replaced by a District Council that was formed on 7 March 1849 with 24 elected representatives and acted as the first democratic representation in Liechtenstein. In addition, the title of Landvogt was changed to governor (Landesverweser) with Menzinger continuing in the role. Menzinger served as the first governor of Liechtenstein until 15 March 1861. Burmeister noted that Menzinger "governed Liechtenstein conscientiously for 28 years, often under difficult circumstances. Unlike his predecessors, he showed understanding for the concerns of the people." He moved to Munich in May 1861 and later to Überlingen in May 1864. He was married to Luise Schreiber; they had nine children, including the artist Moriz Menzinger. He died in Überlingen on 5 September 1877, at the age of 84.
