= Marion Scott (musicologist) =

English violinist, music critic, composer and poet (1877 - 1953)

Marion Margaret Scott (16 July 1877 – 24 December 1953) was an English violinist, musicologist, writer, music critic, editor, composer, and poet.

== Early life and education ==
Marion M. Scott was the eldest of three daughters born in London to Sydney Charles Scott (1849–1936), a solicitor and gifted pianist, and Annie Prince Scott (1853–1942), an American who was born and reared in St. Petersburg, Russia, where her father George Prince managed William Ropes and Company, a Boston, Massachusetts-based family mercantile business. Born at Lewisham, Marion Scott was privately educated. She spent her childhood in Norwood where The Crystal Palace became central to her early life. Her liberal parents, who were social activists, valued the arts and enrolled Scott in the Crystal Palace School of Art when she was about four years old. Scott began piano lessons at an early age but found her teacher uninspiring. Eventually she abandoned the piano for the violin, an instrument she believed possessed a soul. By the age of 15, Scott was performing regularly around London with her father as accompanist, winning acclaim from audiences and critics. Her parents purchased a Guadagnini violin for her.

Marion Scott entered the Royal College of Music in 1896 to study violin with Enrique Fernández Arbós, piano with Marmaduke Barton, and composition with Charles Villiers Stanford and Walford Davies. She was among Stanford's first female pupils, who also included Mary J. A. Wurm and Katharine Ramsay (later the Duchess of Athol). Scott gained her ARCM in 1900 but continued her student affiliation with the RCM until 1903.

== Early musical career ==
Scott returned to the college in 1906 when she along with Dr. Emily Daymond and Aubrey Aiken Crawshaw founded the Royal College of Music Student Union. Scott became the Union secretary, a position equivalent to that of executive director. She developed the popular "At Homes" that offered students an opportunity to come together to perform their music and to socialise. These events were often held at the Scott family's elegant home on Westbourne Terrace. Later Scott served as editor of the Royal College of Music Magazine (1939–1944), carrying it through the difficult war years from her temporary residence in Bridgwater, where she and her sister Stella had gone with their elderly mother.

In 1908, Scott founded her own string quartet, The Marion Scott Quartet, mainly to introduce contemporary British music to London audiences. Their programs at Aeolian Hall featured new works by Stanford, Frank Bridge, James Friskin, Hubert Parry, William Hurlstone and others, as well as occasional early music by Purcell and Arne and their contemporaries. In her innovative programming Scott featured trios, quintets, songs, and vocal ensembles to provide musical diversity. Although she was a gifted violinist, frequent ill health prevented Scott from pursuing a career as a solo concert artist, but she continued to work as a musician giving recitals and playing in orchestras, often serving as leader under conductors including Charles Stanford, Gustav Holst, Walter Parratt and Samuel Coleridge-Taylor. Scott's compositions, mainly her songs and chamber works, received occasional performances although none were published. She was among the earliest modern English composers to write for voice and string quartet.

== Career ==
It was not as a musician that Marion Scott was to achieve success but as a writer and musicologist. Writing came easily to Marion Scott as it did to all members of her family. As a child she produced a magazine for circulation among her young friends. She wrote verse and in 1905 published her only collection of poetry, Violin Verses (The Walter Scott Publishing Company, London). Some critics called the slim volume "charming", the poems "exceedingly gracious, clever and withal philosophical", while others found it uneven in quality and weighed down by "too many adjectives". In 1909, Scott began publishing occasional articles about music in London newspapers, including the Daily Express.

1910 was a productive year for Scott. She developed a series of lectures on music history and performance as well as separate teaching lectures on composition, harmony, orchestration and other technical aspects of music that she offered to organisations and clubs throughout London. Her lectures on topics such as "The Evolution of English Music", "Folk Songs of the Four Races – England, Scotland, Wales, Ireland" and "English Music: The Inheritance of the Past", featured pianists and singers who illustrated Scott's talk with musical examples. She became a regular contributor to "The Chamber Music" supplement of The Music Student, often collaborating on articles with her friend the composer and pianist Katharine Eggar (1874–1961).

In 1911, Marion Scott met composer-poet Ivor Gurney (1890–1937), who arrived at the Royal College of Music from Gloucester as a scholarship student. Despite the difference in the age and social position, they formed an enduring friendship. When Gurney began writing poetry during World War I, Scott encouraged him and acted as both his business manager and editor as he sent an increasing number of poems home from the Front. With the help of composer Thomas Dunhill (1877–1946), Scott found a publisher for Gurney's first volume of poetry, Severn and Somme (1917). After the war she continued to champion both his music and his poetry. When Gurney was committed to the City of London Mental Hospital in 1922 suffering from severe bipolar illness, Scott remained close to him, dealing with his doctors, making decisions about his care, taking him on day trips and providing financial support. She persuaded Gurney's family, particularly his younger brother Ronald, to send her what they had of Ivor's music, poems and letters for safekeeping. After Gurney's death in 1937, she gained full control of Gurney's estate through Letters of Administration.

In 1919, Scott became the London correspondent for The Christian Science Monitor. Scott used this powerful position to introduce and promote the music of her friends and colleagues regularly in America. From 1919 on, her writing appeared in Music and Letters, The Music Student, Music and Youth, The Musical Quarterly, The Listener, The Music Review, Monthly Musical Record, Music Magazine, The Musical Times, Music Bulletin, Royal College of Music Magazine, Radio Times, Daily Telegraph, Observer, and The Christian Science Monitor. She ended her association with The Christian Science Monitor in 1933.

In addition to her essays, articles and criticism, Scott wrote programme notes for the BBC Symphony Orchestra, the Haydn Orchestra and for the Royal Philharmonic Society, delivered papers to the Musical Association (now the Royal Musical Association), produced broadcasts for Music Magazine, and wrote entries for Cobbett's Cyclopedic Survey of Chamber Music, Cobbett's Chamber Music Supplement, and Grove's Dictionary of Music and Musicians. In 1938, her brief study of Mendelssohn was added to the Novello series of Biographies of Great Musicians.

Scott published her only full-length book, Beethoven, in 1934 under the J. M. Dent & Sons, Ltd. imprint as part of the Music Masters Series. This 343-page illustrated biography remains a classic study of the man and his music. The book met with both critical and public acclaim, the degree of its popularity underscored by the fact that it was reprinted numerous times. Her book is still in demand today and is often quoted by contemporary writers discussing the metaphysical perspectives of Beethoven's life and work. Her brief study of Mendelssohn later appeared in the Novello series of Biographies of Great Musicians.

Scott established herself as an international authority on Haydn, publishing dozens of articles and studies about him between 1930 and 1952. She published her own editions of Haydn's music with Oxford University Press; however, her book about Haydn's chamber music was left incomplete at the time of her death, when she was assisted by Kathleen Dale. Her massive Haydn Catalogue appeared in the Grove's Dictionary of Music and Musicians in 1954.

== Society of Women Musicians ==
Scott was a champion of contemporary music and an advocate for women in music. She was the moving force behind the founding of the Society of Women Musicians (1911–1972) with her friends Katherine Eggar and Gertrude Eaton (1861–1940), a singer, editor and prison reformer. The society was formed to promote a sense of co-operation among women in different fields of music, provide performance opportunities and advice, and would even help women with the practical business aspects of their work. The founding women and their Provisional Council made it clear that the society would have no political agenda and that it would be open to men who could join as associate members. Singer and composer Liza Lehmann (1862–1918) served as the first SWM president. By 1918, the SWM had earned such an enviable reputation that music critic, editor and teacher Percy A. Scholes (1877–1958) regarded the organisation as "a model for men".

== Death and legacy ==
Scott died from colon cancer on 24 December 1953.

Marion Scott was a significant force in reshaping women's roles in classical music, in promoting and championing the work of several generations of British composers and musicians. Her pioneering work as a music critic and musicologist encouraged other women to work in fields previously closed to them.
