= List of Landvogts of Liechtenstein =

The Landvogt of Liechtenstein was the title of the head of the district office (Oberamt) from 1719 to 1848, which was subordinate to the court of House of Liechtenstein. The Landvogt acted as a representative of the sovereign prince of Liechtenstein, assisted by the rent master and land clerk. The position was considered the de facto head of the country due to the prince being almost always absent from the country; the first visit by a sovereign prince did not take place until 1842.

The position originates from the 14th century in the County of Vaduz. It was originally an undesired post within the court, and due to the holder always being a foreigner, it was frequently a source of hostility by the Liechtenstein population. This changed after Michael Menzinger applied for the role in 1833. As a concession following the Revolution of 1848 in Liechtenstein, the title was changed to governor (Landesverweser), although the position itself remained unchanged until the ratification of the 1862 constitution of Liechtenstein on 26 September, when the Oberamt was dissolved and replaced with the government of Liechtenstein.

== List of Landvogts ==
No.	Portrait	Name (born-died)	Term of office	Monarch (Reign)	Ref(s).
1		Johann Christoph von Bentz (1673–1750)	1720–1727	Anton Florian (1718–1721)	
1		Johann Christoph von Bentz (1673–1750)	1720–1727	Joseph Johann Adam (1721–1732)	
2		Johann Erwin von Keil (?–?)	1727–1730	Joseph Johann Adam (1721–1732)	
3		Franz Anton Keller (?–?)	1730 – 12 March 1734	Joseph Johann Adam (1721–1732)	
3		Franz Anton Keller (?–?)	1730 – 12 March 1734	Johann Nepomuk Karl (1732–1748)	
4		Anton Bauer (?–?)	1734–1747	Johann Nepomuk Karl (1732–1748)	
5		Johann Kaspar Laaba (?–?)	4 February 1748 – 1751	Johann Nepomuk Karl (1732–1748)	
5		Johann Kaspar Laaba (?–?)	4 February 1748 – 1751	Joseph Wenzel I (1748–1772)	
6		Franz Karl von Grillot (?–?)	1751–1770	Joseph Wenzel I (1748–1772)	
7		Gabriel Reinhard (?–?) Acting	5 April 1771 – 24 October 1771	Joseph Wenzel I (1748–1772)	
8		Anton Ferdinand Funkner von Funken (~1730–1775)	1771–1775 †	Joseph Wenzel I (1748–1772)	
8		Anton Ferdinand Funkner von Funken (~1730–1775)	1771–1775 †	Franz Joseph I (1772–1781)	
9		Johann Michael Heinrich Gilm von Rosenegg (1736–1814)	1775–1788	Franz Joseph I (1772–1781)	
9		Johann Michael Heinrich Gilm von Rosenegg (1736–1814)	1775–1788	Aloys I (1781–1805)	
10	A portrait of Franz Xaver Menzinger from around 1790.	Franz Xaver Menzinger (1740–1809)	20 December 1788 – 1 October 1808	Aloys I (1781–1805)	
10	A portrait of Franz Xaver Menzinger from around 1790.	Franz Xaver Menzinger (1740–1809)	20 December 1788 – 1 October 1808	Johann I Joseph (1805–1836)	
11		Joseph Schuppler (1776–1833)	1 October 1808 – 1 February 1827	Johann I Joseph (1805–1836)	
12	A photograph of Peter Pokorny.	Peter Pokorny (1795–1866)	1 February 1827 – 30 June 1833	Johann I Joseph (1805–1836)	
13	A photograph of Michael Menzinger in 1845.	Michael Menzinger (1792–1877)	5 September 1833 – 1848	Johann I Joseph (1805–1836)	
13	A photograph of Michael Menzinger in 1845.	Michael Menzinger (1792–1877)	5 September 1833 – 1848	Aloys II (1836–1858)	

== See also ==
- District Office (Liechtenstein)
- List of monarchs of Liechtenstein
- List of heads of government of Liechtenstein
