= Vícemilice =

- Village
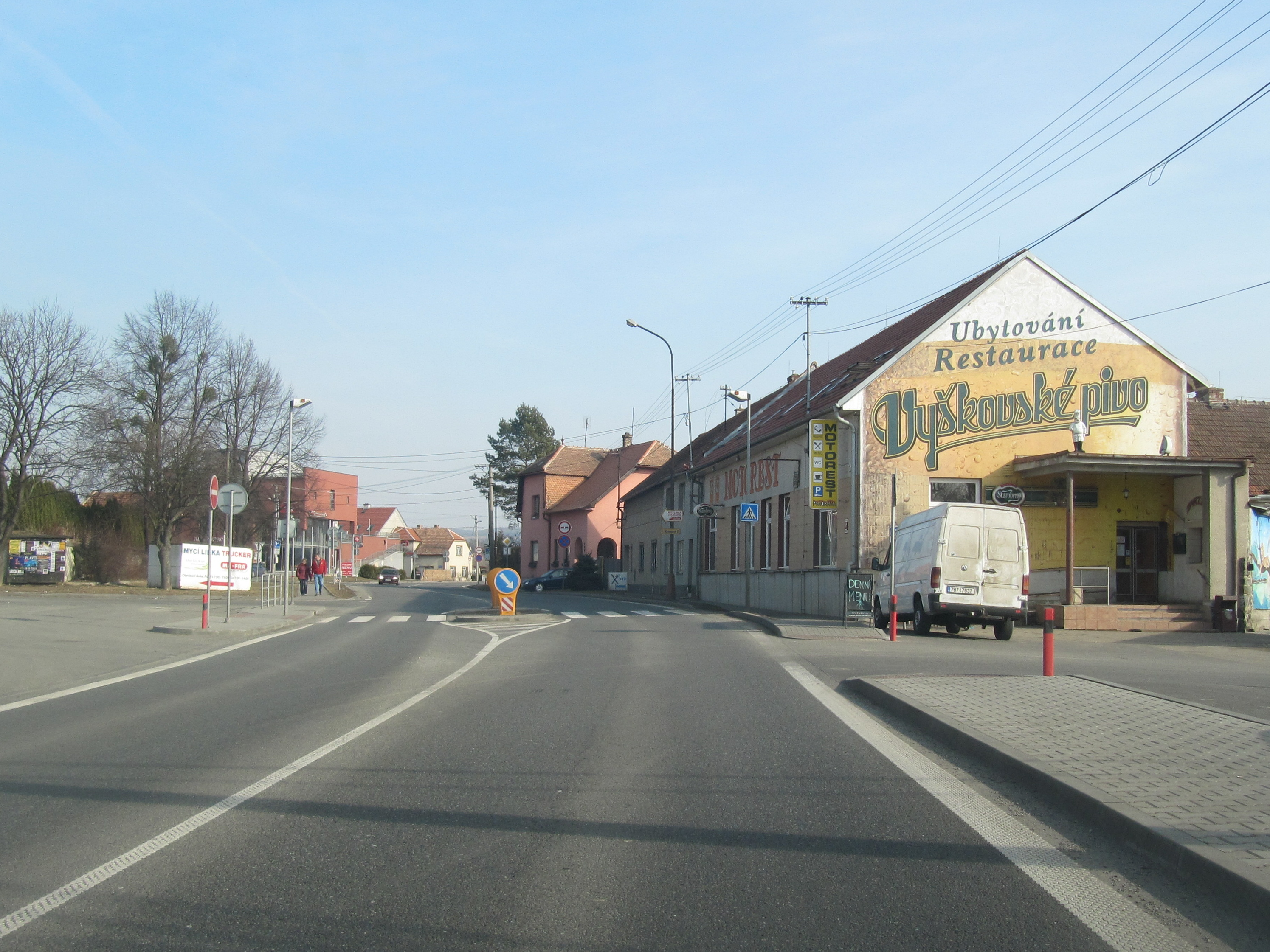
- Slovenská street

- Location in the Czech Republic
- Coordinates: 49°8′33″N 17°1′14″E
- Country: Czech Republic
- Region: South Moravian
- District: Vyškov
- Municipality: Bučovice

Area
  - Total: 5.14 km^{2} (1.98 sq mi)
- Elevation: 225 m (738 ft)

Population (2021)
  - Total: 758
  - Density: 147/km^{2} (382/sq mi)
- Time zone: UTC+1 (CET)
  - Summer (DST): UTC+2 (CEST)
- Postal code: 685 01

Vícemilice is a village and municipal part of Bučovice in Vyškov District in the South Moravian Region of the Czech Republic. It has about 800 inhabitants. It is located on the right bank of the Litava river.

== Name ==
In the 14th and 15th centuries, the most common name for the village was Vícemilice; then, and especially in the 16th and 17th centuries, the common form was Vicomělice. After 1918, there was a return to the previously used Vícemilice.

== History ==
The first mention is from 1349, when Jaroš and Kojata of Vícemilice are named after the village. Under the ownership of Bernard Ant. Brabanský of Chobřany, around 1700, the Vícemilice chateau was built, later modified in the Baroque style. In 1798, the estate was purchased by Aloys I of Liechtenstein. The chateau was demolished in 2020 and 99 new residential units were built in its place in a development project.

== Demographics ==
Historical population

Year	Pop.	±%
1869	685	—
1880	747	+9.1%
1890	726	−2.8%
1900	763	+5.1%
1910	858	+12.5%

Year	Pop.	±%
1921	831	−3.1%
1930	813	−2.2%
1950	830	+2.1%
1961	816	−1.7%
1970	775	−5.0%

Year	Pop.	±%
1980	804	+3.7%
1991	726	−9.7%
2001	738	+1.7%
2011	743	+0.7%
2021	758	+2.0%

Source: Censuses

== Nature conservation ==
The constructed reservoirs with a biocenter are located in Vícemilice. They are located in the area of the original, long-extinct pond southwest of Vícemilice. They make maximum use of the space between the Litava river and the location of the planned railway relocation.

The cascade of two reservoirs is designed to be independently dischargeable. The ponds have an extensive coastal zone and are supplied by the Litava, which is equipped with a pool for settling sediments from the river.

The reservoirs have the ability to retain a significant volume of water during extraordinary flows in the Litava.

== Sights ==
Baroque statue of John of Nepomuk from the mid-18th century was stolen around 2000. For the feast in May 2002, a new one was erected and consecrated on the original pedestal – the author is a local native, sculptor-carver Josef Staněk Jr.
