= Černčín =

- Municipal part of Bučovice
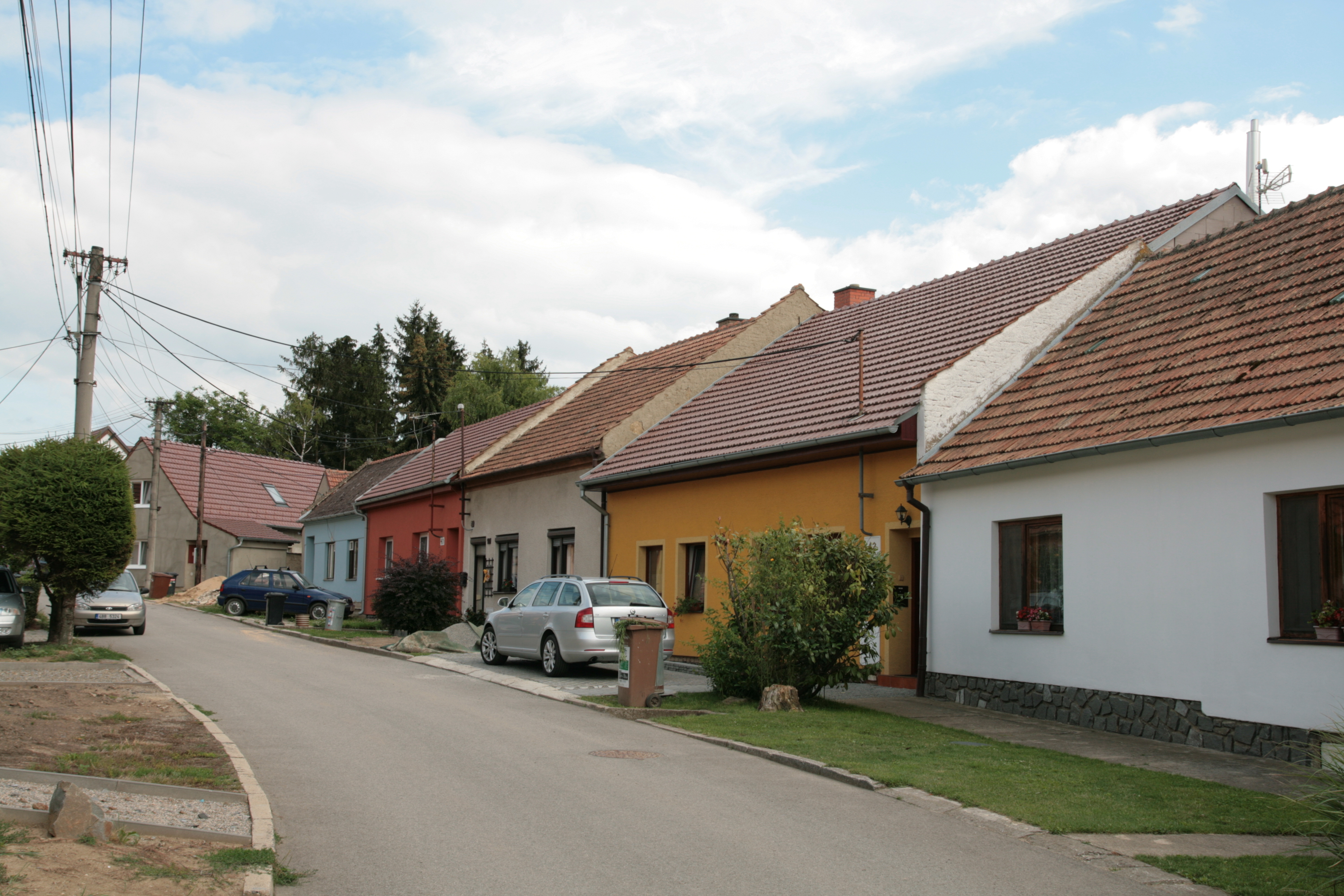
- Potoční street
- Interactive map of Černčín
- Country: Czech Republic
- Region: South Moravian Region
- Municipality: Bučovice

Area
  - Total: 2.92 km^{2} (1.13 sq mi)

Population (2021)
  - Total: 359
  - Density: 123/km^{2} (318/sq mi)
- Time zone: UTC+1 (CET)
  - Summer (DST): UTC+2 (CEST)
- Postal code: 685 01

Černčín (known as Čerčín until 1925, German: Tschertscheid) is a village and municipal part of Bučovice in Vyškov District of the South Moravian Region of the Czech Republic. It has about 400 inhabitants.

== Etymology ==
The name of the village was derived from the personal name Černka, in the older form Črnka - from 1534 the name Črnčín is documented. The meaning of the local name was "Černka's property".

== Demographics ==
Historical population

Year	Pop.	±%
1869	345	—
1880	411	+19.1%
1890	399	−2.9%
1900	446	+11.8%
1910	514	+15.2%

Year	Pop.	±%
1921	485	−5.6%
1930	470	−3.1%
1950	466	−0.9%
1961	446	−4.3%
1970	380	−14.8%

Year	Pop.	±%
1980	344	−9.5%
1991	278	−19.2%
2001	292	+5.0%
2011	348	+19.2%
2021	359	+3.2%

Source: Censuses

== Monuments ==
- Memorial stone (cultural monument thanks to its historic and topographic location)
- Černecký a Milonický Grove (Special Area of Conservation)
