= Franz Anton Keller =

Landvogt of Liechtenstein from 1730 to 1734

Landvogt of Liechtenstein
- In office 1730 – 12 March 1734
- Monarchs: Joseph Johann Adam; Johann Nepomuk Karl
- Preceded by: Johann Erwin von Keil
- Succeeded by: Anton Bauer (As Court Administrator)

Franz Anton Keller was the Landvogt of Liechtenstein from 1730 to 1734.

He was from Ingolstadt and studied in the city. During his time as Landvogt, he successfully appealed to have his residency moved due to foehn wind. Johann Nepomuk Karl, Prince of Liechtenstein overturned a ruling Keller had made regarding a conflict between a pastor from Eschen and the municipality of Mauren regarding timber rights, and then sent a commissioner to Vaduz to investigate it.

Keller frequently conflicted with Anton Bauer, the then administrator of Vaduz. In 1733, he was forced out of negotiations regarding reforms previously made by Stephan Christoph Harpprecht von Harpprechtstein. He was dismissed as Landvogt in disgrace the following year and succeeded by Bauer.
