= Franz Karl von Grillot =

Landvogt of Liechtenstein from 1751 to 1770

Landvogt of Liechtenstein
- In office 1751–1770
- Monarch: Joseph Wenzel I
- Preceded by: Johann Kaspar Laaba
- Succeeded by: Gabriel Reinhard (acting)

Personal details
- Spouse: Maria Anna von Pierron

Franz Karl von Grillot was an envoy of Joseph Wenzel I, Prince of Liechtenstein and Landvogt of Liechtenstein from 1751 to 1770.

During his time as Landvogt, he suggested that Joseph Wenzel I redeemed the debt owed to the Jews, amounting to 30,000 guilders. He was also periodically the Liechtenstein envoy to the Swabian Circle. He was unpopular, and after complaints about his corruption in office he was removed as Landvogt in 1770, and temporarily succeeded by Gabriel Reinhard the following year.
