= Georg Vierling =

German musician and composer (1820–1901)

Georg Vierling (5 September 1820 – 1 June 1901) was a German musician and composer. He is noted for modernizing the secular oratorio form.

== Life and career ==
Georg Vierling was born in Frankenthal, and studied music with Christian Heinrich Rinck in Darmstadt and composer Adolf Bernhard Marx in Berlin. In 1847, he became an organist in Frankfurt, and later director of the Singing Academy and in 1852 director of the Song Board in Mainz. In 1853 Vierling founded the Bach Verein in Berlin, and in 1859 he became Director of Music at the Royal Academy of the Arts in Berlin. In 1883, he became a member of the Prussian Academy of Arts. He died in Wiesbaden. After his death, memorial performances of his cantatas were held in Stuttgart. Notable students include George Lichtenstein.

== Works ==
Vierling's compositions include songs and choral works, piano and organ works, overtures and one symphony. Selected works include:

- Hero and Leander
- The robbery of the Sabinerinnen
- Constantin
- Alarich
- The gentleman instructed his angels
- Sturm
- Maria Stuart
- Im Frühling
- Hermannsschlacht
- Tragic Overture
- String Quartet (No.2, Op. 76) in A major

In reviving the secular cantata Vierling, played a role comparable to Max Bruch.
