= Bučovice =

Town in the Czech Republic

- Town
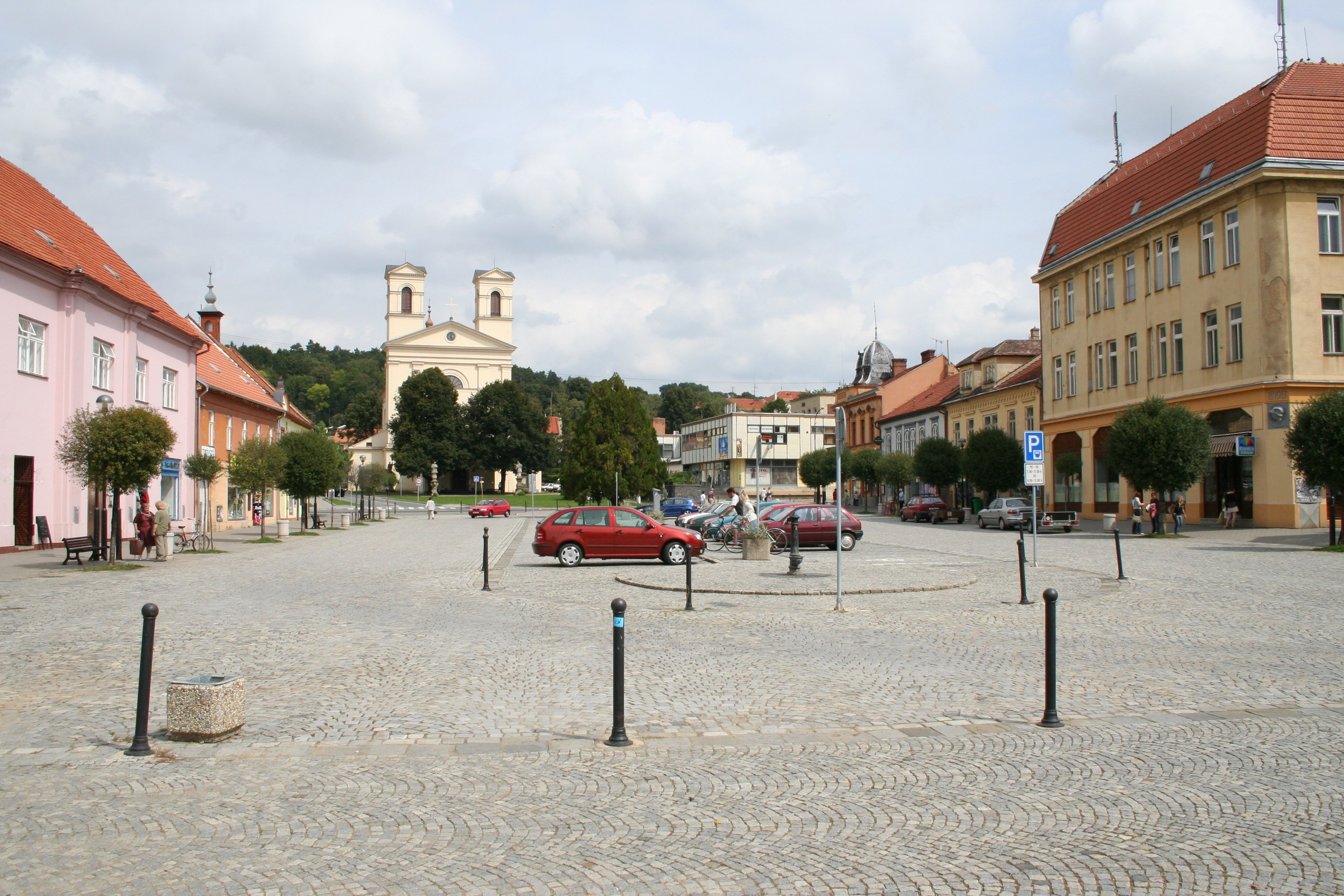
- Town square

- Flag Coat of arms

- Location in the Czech Republic
- Coordinates: 49°8′56″N 17°0′7″E
- Country: Czech Republic
- Region: South Moravian
- District: Vyškov
- First mentioned: 1322

Government
  - Mayor: Jiří Horák (KDU-ČSL)

Area
  - Total: 31.18 km^{2} (12.04 sq mi)
- Elevation: 230 m (750 ft)

Population (2026-01-01)
  - Total: 6,859
  - Density: 220.0/km^{2} (569.7/sq mi)
- Time zone: UTC+1 (CET)
  - Summer (DST): UTC+2 (CEST)
- Postal code: 685 01
- Website: www.bucovice.cz

Bučovice (Czech pronunciation: [ˈbutʃovɪtsɛ]; German: Butschowitz) is a town in Vyškov District in the South Moravian Region of the Czech Republic. It has about 6,900 inhabitants. The town is located on the Litava River, on the border between the Litenčice Hills and Ždánice Forest.

The most important monument of Bučovice is Bučovice Castle, which is protected as a national cultural monument.

== Administrative division ==
Bučovice consists of five municipal parts (in brackets population according to the 2021 census):

- Bučovice (4,406)
- Černčín (359)
- Kloboučky (549)
- Marefy (372)
- Vícemilice (758)

== Etymology ==
The name is derived from the personal name Buček (a shortened form of Budislav or Budivoj).

== Geography ==
Bučovice is located about 14 kilometres (9 mi) south of Vyškov and 26 km (16 mi) east of Brno. It lies on the border between the Litenčice Hills and Ždánice Forest. The highest point is the Radlovec hill at 426 m (1,398 ft) above sea level. The Litava River flows through the town.

== History ==
The first written mention of Bučovice is from 1322. However, a stone church stood here already in the 13th century. In the late 14th century, it was referred to as a market town with vineyards.

In the 16th century, Bučovice prospered and developed. The owner of the estate Jan Šembera Černohorský of Boskovice had built here one of the most magnificent Renaissance residences in Moravia. The castle was finished by his son-in-law Maximilian of Liechtenstein in the 1630s. During the Thirty Years' War in 1645, Bučovice was looted and damaged by the Swedish troops, but the castle was defended.

In the second half of the 18th and the first half of the 19th century, Bučovice was one of the most important centres of cloth production in Moravia. The owners of the textile companies of the time belonged to a large Jewish community. In the second half of the 19th century, Bučovice further developed and gained the character of a town. During the 20th century, the most important economic sector in the town became the woodworking industry.

After World War II, the castle was confiscated by the state from the Liechtenstein family.

== Demographics ==
Historical population

Year	Pop.	±%
1869	4,852	—
1880	5,148	+6.1%
1890	5,205	+1.1%
1900	5,427	+4.3%
1910	5,731	+5.6%

Year	Pop.	±%
1921	5,710	−0.4%
1930	5,642	−1.2%
1950	5,910	+4.8%
1961	5,902	−0.1%
1970	5,850	−0.9%

Year	Pop.	±%
1980	6,395	+9.3%
1991	6,165	−3.6%
2001	6,321	+2.5%
2011	6,396	+1.2%
2021	6,444	+0.8%

Source: Censuses

== Transport ==
The I/50 road (part of the European route E50), which connects Brno with Uherské Hradiště and the Czech–Slovak border in Starý Hrozenkov, runs through the town.

Bučovice is located on the railway line Brno–Staré Město.

== Sights ==
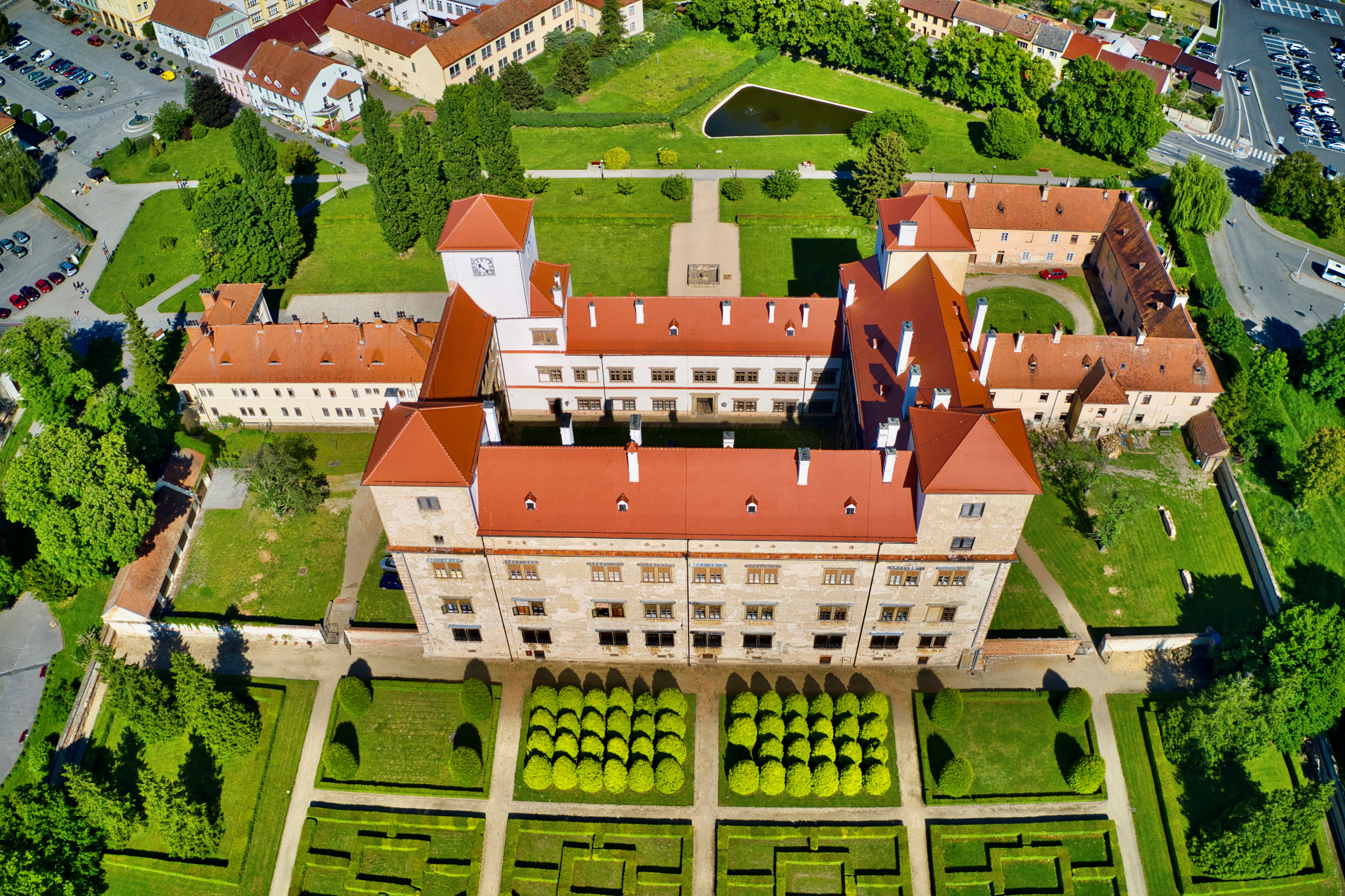
Aerial view of Bučovice Castle

Bučovice is known for the Bučovice Castle. This Renaissance castle was built in the style of Italian villas in 1575–1585. Today it is owned by the state and open to the public. The castle has a noteworthy arcade courtyard with 90 columns, which are decorated with a total of 540 reliefs. In the middle of the courtyard is a Mannerist fountain. The interiors have a rich Mannerist decoration. The castle is protected as a national cultural monument.

An architecturally valuable building is the Church of the Assumption of the Virgin Mary. It was built in the early Baroque style in 1637–1641. In 1748, the interior was modified by Anton Erhard Martinelli. In 1826–1830, the church was modified and extended in the Neoclassical style.

== Notable people ==
- Peter Pokorny (1795–1866), Austrian civil servant
- Joseph Fischhof (1804–1857), Czech-Austrian pianist, composer and professor

== Twin towns – sister cities ==
Bučovice is twinned with:

- Malý Slavkov, Slovakia
