= Anton Door =

Austrian pianist and music educator (1833–1919)

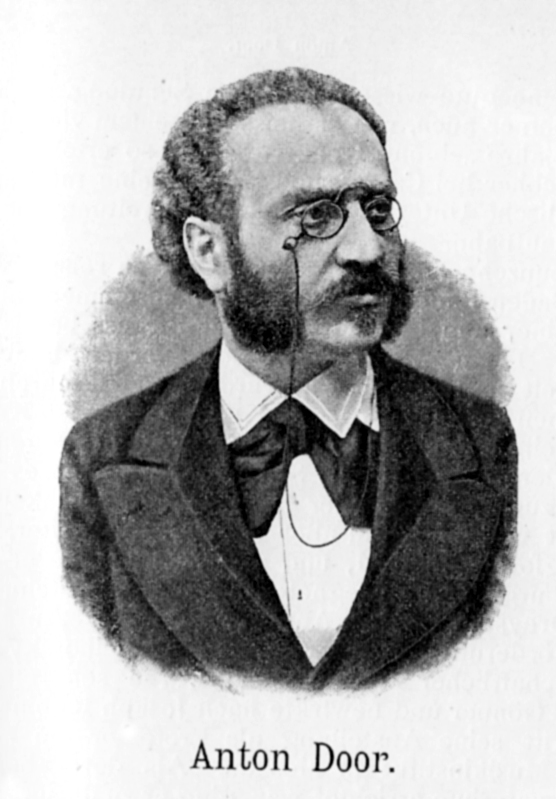
Anton Door

Anton Door (20 June 1833 – 7 November 1919) was an Austrian pianist and music educator, also known in Russia as Anton Andreyevich Door.

== Biography ==
Anton Door was born in Vienna and studied piano with Carl Czerny and theory with Simon Sechter. He began a concert career in 1850, touring as a soloist in Germany and Italy. He was appointed Court Pianist and a member of the Royal Academy in Stockholm, and taught for ten years at the Moscow Conservatory. From 1868-1901 he taught in Vienna at the Gesellschaft der Musikfreunde. He served as president of the Friends of Brahms Society and instituted the organization's concert series. Door was known for emphasis on technical ability, and notable students include Stephan Elmas, Robert Fischhof, Alexander von Zemlinsky, Fritz Steinbach and Laura Netzel. He died in Vienna. See: List of music students by teacher: C to F#Anton Door.

Pyotr Ilyich Tchaikovsky dedicated his Valse-Caprice, Op. 4 (1868) to Anton Door. Camille Saint-Saëns dedicated his Piano Concerto No. 4, Op. 44 (1875) to Anton Door. Paul Pabst dedicated his Piano Concerto Op. 82 (1885) to Anton Door.
