= Marefy =

- Municipal part of Bučovice
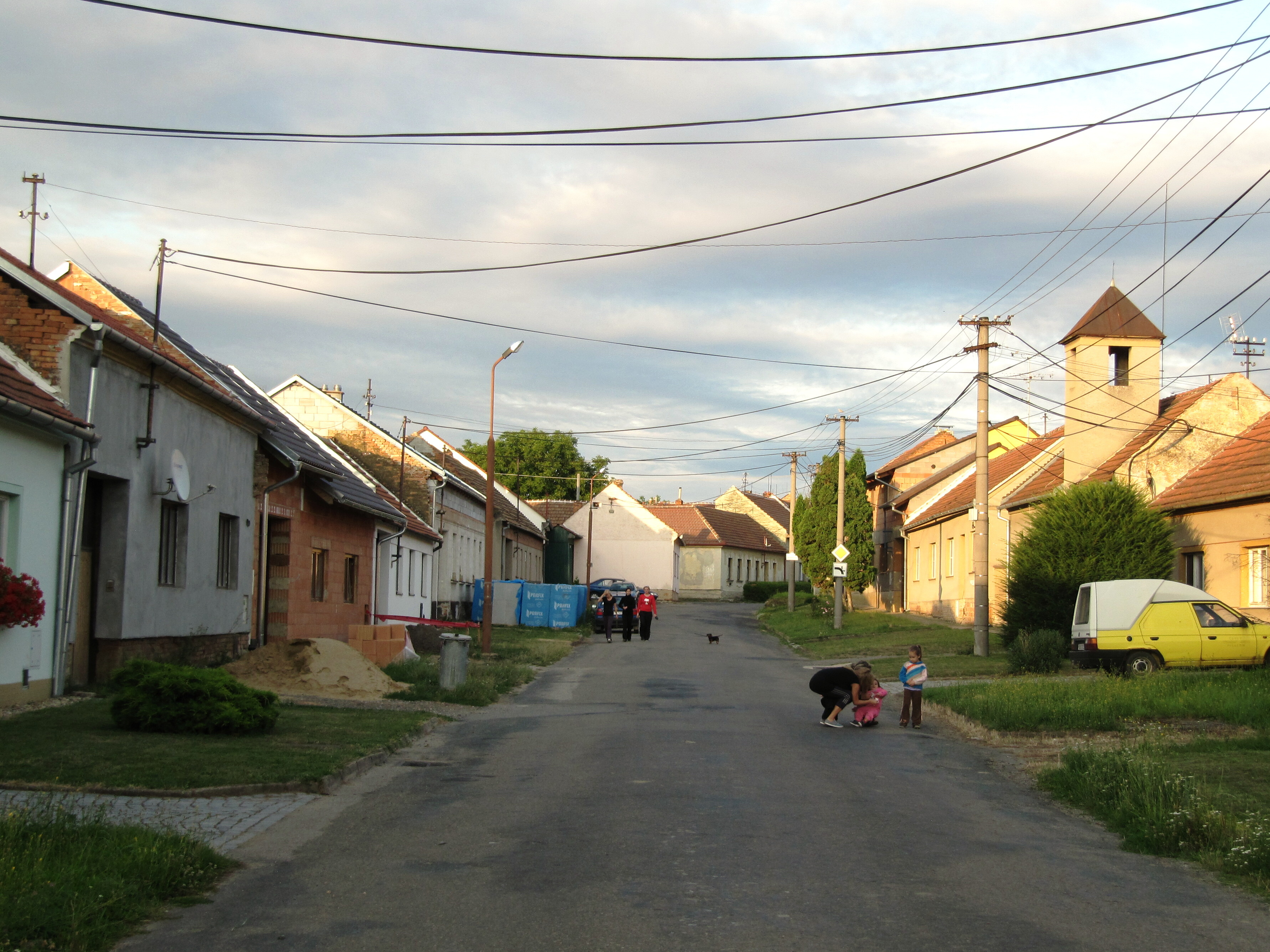
- Main street in Marefy
- Interactive map of Marefy
- Country: Czech Republic
- Region: South Moravian Region
- Municipality: Bučovice

Area
  - Total: 4.85 km^{2} (1.87 sq mi)

Population (2021)
  - Total: 372
  - Density: 76.7/km^{2} (199/sq mi)
- Time zone: UTC+1 (CET)
  - Summer (DST): UTC+2 (CEST)
- Postal code: 685 01

Marefy (formerly also Marhefy and Marhéfy, German: Marhöf) is a village and municipal part of Bučovice, a town in Vyškov District of the South Moravian Region of the Czech Republic. It is located 2.5 kilometres (1.6 mi) west of the main town, on the left bank of the Litava river. It has about 400 inhabitants.

== Etymology ==
The settlement was originally called Meierhof ("courtyard, large estate"). The abbreviation gave rise to the form Marhof and from it the Czech name Marhofy. The vowel -e- in the second syllable of the Czech name was taken from the German diminutive Marhöffen or Marhöfel. Both the German and Czech names were then shortened to Marhöf and Marefy.

== History ==
The first mention dates back to 1250, when a manor house was founded on the site of the local school. The next mention is from 1379, when Jan Kropáč from Holštejn placed a seat cushion in Marefy to Ondřej from Nechvalín. This brought the village into the Bučovice estate.

Recently in 2018, the building with the bell tower, which also serves as a library, was renovated. The library area was doubled, and the building also created a space for activities of associations with a kitchen and social facilities.

== Geography ==
Černčín makes up the western part of Bučovice, and lies approximately 2.5 kilometres (1.6 mi) from its center and 27 kilometres (17 mi) from Brno, at an altitude of 216 metres above sea level.

Marefy contains the protected areas of Člupy and Šévy.

== Demographics ==
Historical population

Year	Pop.	±%
1869	418	—
1880	382	−8.6%
1890	392	+2.6%
1900	396	+1.0%
1910	429	+8.3%

Year	Pop.	±%
1921	501	+16.8%
1930	522	+4.2%
1950	445	−14.8%
1961	444	−0.2%
1970	412	−7.2%

Year	Pop.	±%
1980	379	−8.0%
1991	317	−16.4%
2001	331	+4.4%
2011	357	+7.9%
2021	372	+4.2%

Source: Censuses
