= George Lichtenstein (musician) =

Hungarian pianist and music teacher

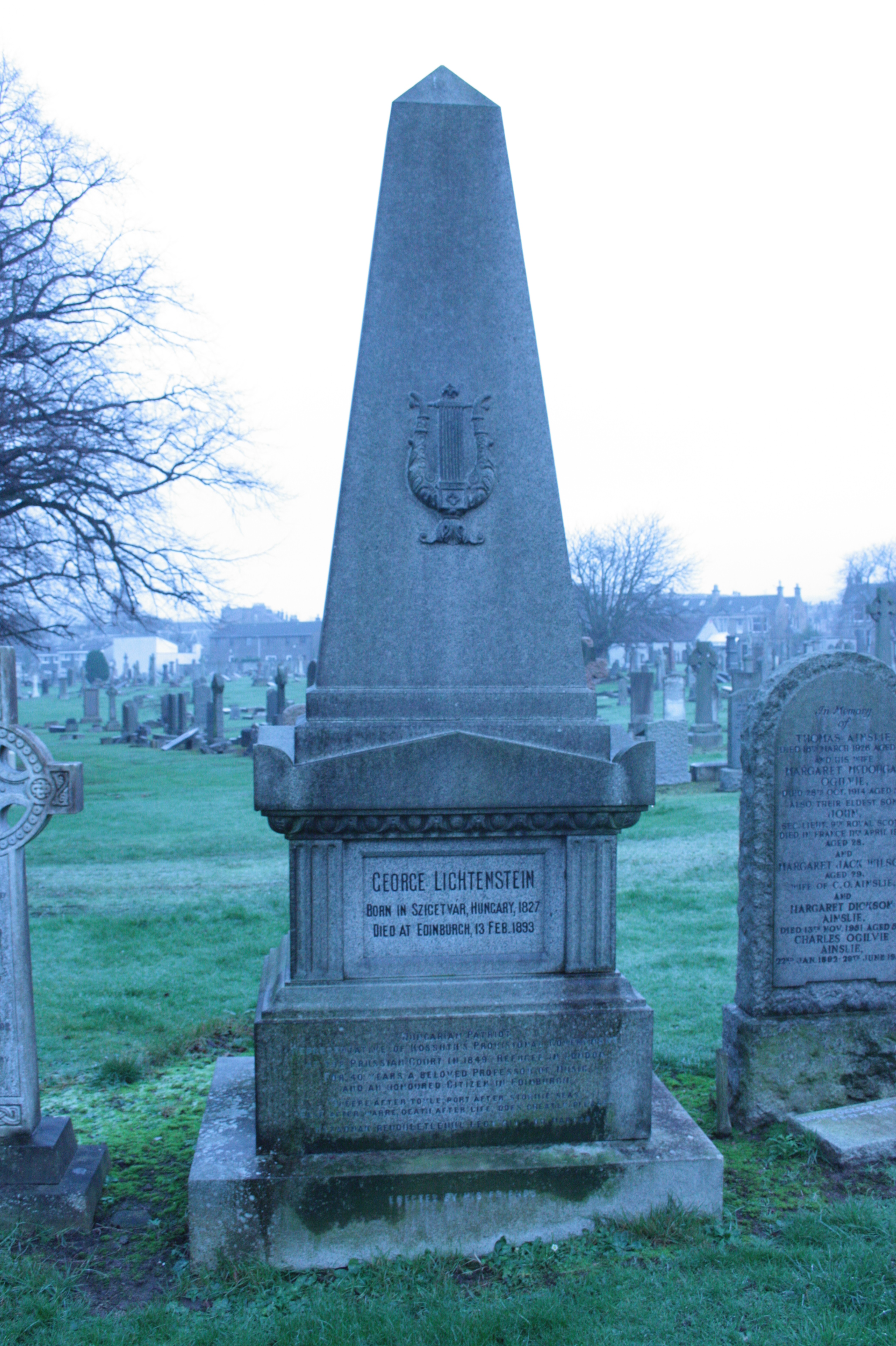
The grave of George Lichtenstein, Morningside Cemetery, Edinburgh

George Lichtenstein (1827 – 13 February 1893) was a Hungarian pianist and music teacher who lived and worked in Edinburgh, Scotland.

== Life and career ==
George Lichtenstein was born in Hungary. As a child, he studied violin and piano with Georg Vierling, and was influenced by the music of Hungarian Gypsies. He continued his studies at school in Pécs and Pressburg and later with Joseph Fischhof in Vienna.

Lichtenstein also studied law and served as secretary to political activist Lajos Kossuth during the Hungarian Revolution of 1848. After the Russian intervention, he fled to Königsberg, and after the convention between Austria and Germany, from there to London in 1851. He was accompanied by his brother F.L. Lichtenstein, who later became editor of the Correspondence de Pesth newspaper. In London, George Lichtenstein was befriended by Jenny Lind and others and worked as a piano teacher and concert pianist.

In 1856 Lichtenstein settled in Edinburgh where he became noted as a music teacher and influence on musical culture of the city. He served as music teacher and accompanist to Prince Alfred, Duke of Edinburgh while he studied at Holyrood. He was a founding member and president of the Edinburgh Society of Musicians and served as Director of the Edinburgh Philosophical Institution. He was director and head of the music department at Charlotte Square Institution. Noted students include composer Helen Hopekirk. Lichtenstein remained unmarried and died at age seventy in Edinburgh.

He is buried in Morningside Cemetery, Edinburgh. The grave is marked by a stout sandstone obelisk near the centre of the western boundary, facing away from the path.
