= Amelia Lehmann =

British composer and arranger

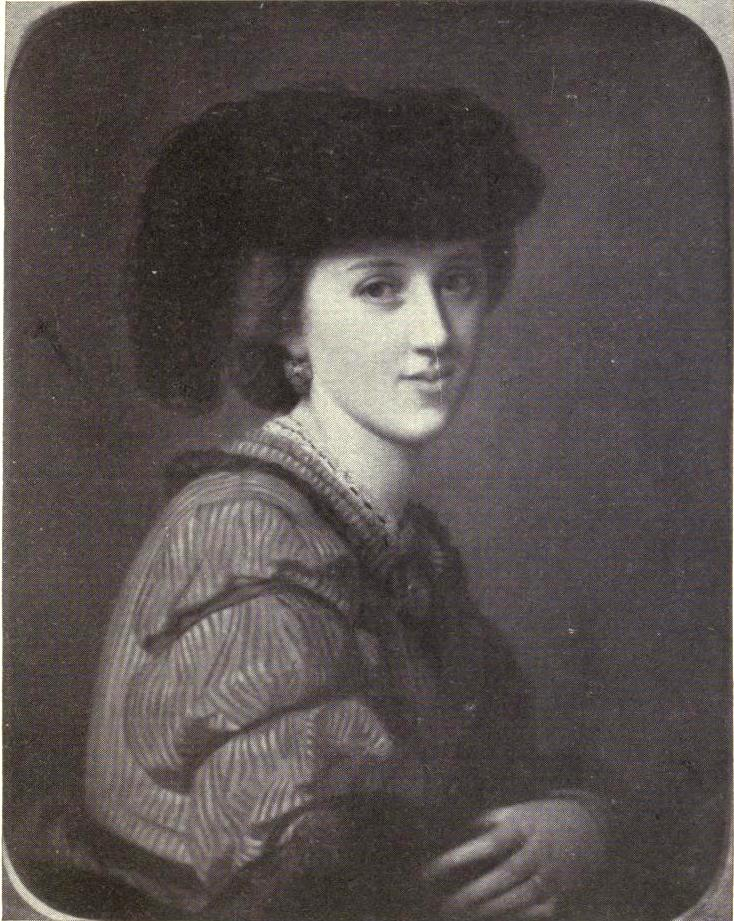
Portrait of Amelia by her husband, Rudolf Lehmann

Amelia Lehmann (née Chambers) (3 February 1838 – 1 April 1903) was a British composer and arranger of art songs and popular ballads, many of which she published under the pseudonym "A. L.". She was also considered a gifted singer and was the first singing teacher of her daughter Liza Lehmann. Among her other students of voice was the soprano Evangeline Florence. Several of her works were performed at the Henry Wood Promenade Concerts between 1897 and 1928, and her song "When love is kind" was recorded by Ada Forrest for Pathé Records. Lehmann Spent some of her life living in Rome, Italy.

Lehmann was the daughter of Anne (née Kirkwood) and Robert Chambers, the Scottish writer and publisher. In 1861, after a lengthy courtship, she married the painter Rudolf Lehmann. Their daughter Liza wrote in her memoirs:

My mother certainly had extraordinary gifts, but suffered all her life from quite abnormally developed diffidence. As a girl, she was so musical that her father declared she did not require lessons! It was, therefore, not until after her marriage that she began to study music seriously. I have met most of the artists of my day, and I have never met any one so naturally gifted as my beloved mother. She had a lovely voice, and studied singing with several vocal teachers of renown; but she was never confident about her own achievements, and could hardly ever be induced to sing before any one. The few people who heard her sing have never forgotten her quite peculiar charm. She had a wonderful ear, the gift known as "absolute pitch," and could transpose easily at sight. She wrote some beautiful music, notably an operatic setting of a Goethe libretto; but the same diffidence and exaggerated, almost morbid self-criticism, led her to destroy most of her compositions, including with them many of her best.
