= Elna Sherman =

Daisy Elna Sherman (12 October 1888 - September 1964) was a composer, musicologist, and teacher with a special interest in Thomas Hardy.

Sherman was born in Massachusetts to Alice M. “Daisy” Fairchild and Sidney Algernon Sherman. Her mother Alice was a music teacher who also composed at least one song. Sherman earned two degrees at the Institute of Musical Art and also studied with Helen Hopekirk and in London.

Sherman taught at the Institute of Musical Art and Boston University College of Music. In 1936, Sherman was able to interview Hardy’s second wife, Florence Dugdale, who told her that Hardy had always wanted to be a musician.

Sherman belonged to The American Composers Alliance of New York, the Musical Association in London, and the Society of Women Musicians. Her works were published by Associated Music Publishers, Oxford University Press, and E. C. Schirmer. Her publications include:

== Articles ==
- Music in Thomas Hardy’s Life and Work (Musical Quarterly, vol 26 no 4 Oct 1940)
- Ravenscroft’s Psalter, 1621; and Its Place in the Early New England Scene (Bulletin of the American Musicological Society no 11/12/13 Sep 1948)
- Thomas Hardy: Lyricist, Symphonist (Music & Letters, vol 21 no 2 Apr 1940)

== Chamber music ==
- For an Oriental Bazaar (three recorders)
- Sonata Lyrica (clarinet and piano; originally for viola and piano)
- St. Francis and the Birds (three recorders, cello and harpsichord)
- Ten Anglo-American Folksongs and Ballads (two recorders)
- Three Dance Movements (five recorders; by Antony Holborne and Robert Parsons; edited by Elna Sherman)
- Wessex Tune Book vol 1 & 2 (descant and piano; compiled by James Hook; arranged by Elna Sherman)

== Piano ==
- Country Wedding

== Voice ==
- “Evening Song, opus 36”
- “Yuletide in a Younger World”
