= Helen Hopekirk =

American classical composer (1856–1945)

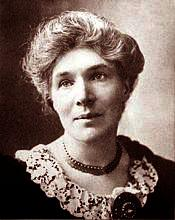
Helen Hopekirk

Helen Hopekirk (20 May 1856 – 19 November 1945) was a Scottish-born American pianist and composer, who after the age of 40, lived and worked in Boston, Massachusetts.

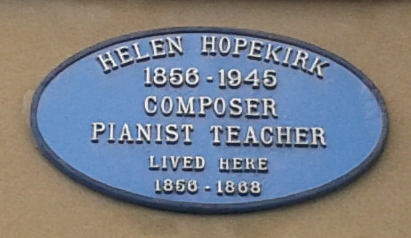
Commemorative blue plaque in Edinburgh

== Life and career ==
Helen Hopekirk was born in Portobello, Edinburgh in Scotland, a daughter of music shop owners Adam and Helen (née Croall) Hopekirk. She studied music with George Lichtenstein and Scottish composer Alexander Mackenzie, and made her debut as a soloist in 1874 with the Edinburgh Amateur Orchestral Society. After other successful performances and the death of her father, she relocated to study composition with Carl Reinecke in Leipzig. After successful debuts in Leipzig and London, she began regular concert tours of Europe.

In 1882 Hopekirk married Edinburgh merchant and music critic William A. Wilson (d. 1926), who began serving as her manager. She made her American debut in 1883 with the Boston Symphony Orchestra and commenced concert tours in the United States. She planned to continue her studies with Franz Liszt, but after his death studied instead with Theodor Leschetizky in Vienna and Czech composer Karel Navrátil in Prague. She and her husband lived in Vienna until 1892, and then moved to Paris, where she began to teach piano. Her students included Anna Diller Starbuck and Elna Sherman.

From the early 1890s she began to devote more time to composition, producing her first large scale work, the Concertstück in D Minor for Piano and Orchestra, written in Paris in 1893–94, performing it with the Scottish Orchestra under Georg Henschel in Edinburgh and Dundee in November 1894. Her husband was injured in a traffic accident, and in 1897 she accepted the invitation of Director George Chadwick to take a teaching position at the New England Conservatory. In 1901 she left the Conservatory and became a private teacher, also continuing her performance career.

In 1900 she performed her Piano Concerto in D major (now lost) with the Boston Symphony Orchestra. Hopekirk gave the first American performances of the Concertstück with the Boston Symphony Orchestra under Wilhelm Gericke on 15–16 April 1904, after which it remained unperformed until 2015.

Hopekirk and her husband became American citizens in 1918. Her last performance was at Steinert Hall, Boston, in 1939. She died in Cambridge, Massachusetts, of a cerebral thrombosis and was buried in Mount Auburn Cemetery.

== Works ==
Hopekirk composed works for piano, violin and orchestra and wrote songs and piano pieces. She often incorporated Scottish folk melodies. Selected works include:

=== Orchestra ===
- Konzertstück in D minor for piano and orchestra (1893–4)
- Piano Concerto in D major
- Sundown (arrangement of piano piece))
- 6 short works for orchestra

=== Chamber ===
- Sonata no.1 for violin and piano
- Sonata no.2 for violin and piano
- Sundown (arrangement of piano piece for piano trio)
- Piano Trio (unfinished)

=== Piano ===
- Romance in A minor (1885)
- Serenade in F# minor (1891)
- Iona Memories (1902–7)
- Sundown (1905)
- Suite for Piano in 5 movements (1917)
- Serenata, Suite in 5 movements (1918)
- Five Scottish Folk Songs (arrangements) (1919)
- Waltz in F# major (c.1915-20)
- Robin Goodfellow (1922)
- Two Compositions for Piano (c.1924)
- Dance to Your Shadow and The Seal-woman’s Sea-joy: Two Tone-Pictures for piano (1929–30)

=== Songs ===
- Blows the wind to-day (Text: Robert Louis Stevenson)
- Eilidh my Fawn (in Five Songs) (Text: William Sharp)
- From the Hills of Dream (in Six Poems by Fiona Macleod) (Text: William Sharp)
- Hushing song (in Five Songs) (Text: William Sharp)
- Mo-lennav-a-chree (in Five Songs) (Text: William Sharp)
- On bonnie birdeen (in Six Poems by Fiona Macleod) (Text: William Sharp)
- Requiescat (Text: Matthew Arnold)
- Sag ich ließ sie grüßen (in Five Songs) (Text: Heinrich Heine) ENG ITA
- St. Bride's lullaby (in Six Poems by Fiona Macleod) (Text: William Sharp)
- The Bandruidh (in Five Songs) (Text: William Sharp)
- The bird of Christ (in Six Poems by Fiona Macleod) (Text: William Sharp)
- The lonely hunter (in Six Poems by Fiona Macleod) (Text: William Sharp)
- The sea hath its pearls (in Five Songs) (Text: Henry Wadsworth Longfellow after Heinrich Heine)
- There was an ancient monarch (in Five Songs) (Text: after Heinrich Heine)
- Thy dark eyes to mine (in Five Songs) (Text: William Sharp)
- When the dew is falling (in Six Poems by Fiona Macleod) (Text: William Sharp)
