= Alma Goatley =

English composer

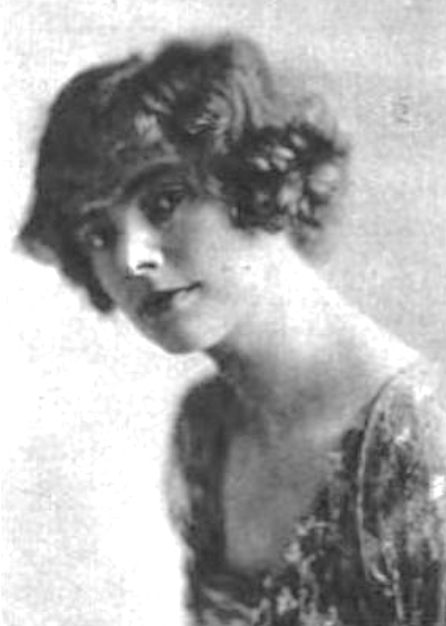
- Alma Goatley, from a 1920 publication
- Born: 1887; Savoie, France
- Died: 27 August 1969 (aged 81–82); London, UK
- Other name: Alma Goatley Temple-Smith
- Occupations: Musician, composer

Alma Goatley Temple-Smith (1887 – 27 August 1969) was an English musician and composer. From 1935 to 1936, she was president of the Society of Women Musicians.

== Early life ==
Alma Goatley was born in Savoie, and raised in London, the daughter of British parents Grafton Goatley and Louisa Goatley. She won the Chappell Pianoforte Prize in 1911 at the Royal Academy of Music.

== Career ==
Goatley composed music for recital songs and as settings for poems. She also taught harmony at Redhill, and performed as a diseuse at the piano. A 1919 reviewer found her "charming, both in her singing and in her fascinating humour." In 1922, she was one of the composers featured at a concert of works by women composers in London, sharing the bill with composers including Ethel Smyth and Katharine Emily Eggar. She was president of the Society of Women Musicians from 1935 to 1936, during its "jubilee" year.

== Compositions ==
- Four Nursery Rhymes (1912)
- "As I hear your dainty Footstep" (1915)
- "Now that April's there" (1917, lyrics by Robert Browning)
- "A Garden is a lovesome thing" (1917, with Thomas Edward Brown)
- "A Dream Ship" (1918, lyrics by Crosbie Garstin)
- "Hush-a-bye-low" (1918)
- "Nesting-time" (1919, with Helen Taylor)
- "The Wood Anemone" (1919, lyrics by D. Bouverie)
- Songs of Sappho: 5 Lyrics (1919, with Bliss Carman)
- "Pipe out, ye silver flutes" (1919)
- "Lovelight" (1919, lyrics by Will H. Ogilvie)
- "Futility" (1920)
- "Life" (1920, lyrics by S. D. Cox)
- "Butterfly Boats" (1920, lyrics by H. Taylor)
- "The White Birch" (1921, lyrics by Lane Northcott)
- "Sea Surge" (1921)
- "Love and Wine" (1922)
- "Can't Remember" (1922, lyrics by Herbert J. Brandon)
- "Life Anew" (1923, with Temple Keble)
- "Second Thoughts" (1924)
- "Sixpence to Spend" (1926, with Mab Davis)
- "Come, happy heart" (1929, with Dorothy Hayes)
- "Villanelle" (1929)
- Two Songs of Child Life (1929)
- "The Cherry Tree doth Bloom" (1933, lyrics by Margaret Owen)
- "When June is Come" (1935, lyrics by Robert Bridges)
- "The Little Apple Tree" (1935, lyrics by Dorothy Dickinson)
- "Love Errant" (1935, lyrics by H. Hart)
- "A walk by the river at night" (1935, lyrics by Clifford Bax)
- "Teasing Song" (1936, lyrics by Eleanor Farjeon)
- "Shall I be afraid?" (1942, lyrics by Dorothy Dickinson)

== Personal life ==
Alma Goatley married furniture designer Hamilton Temple-Smith in 1920. They had two sons; their elder son, John Grafton Temple-Smith, had a career in film. She died in 1969, in her seventies, in London.
