= Evangeline Florence =

American-born concert soprano

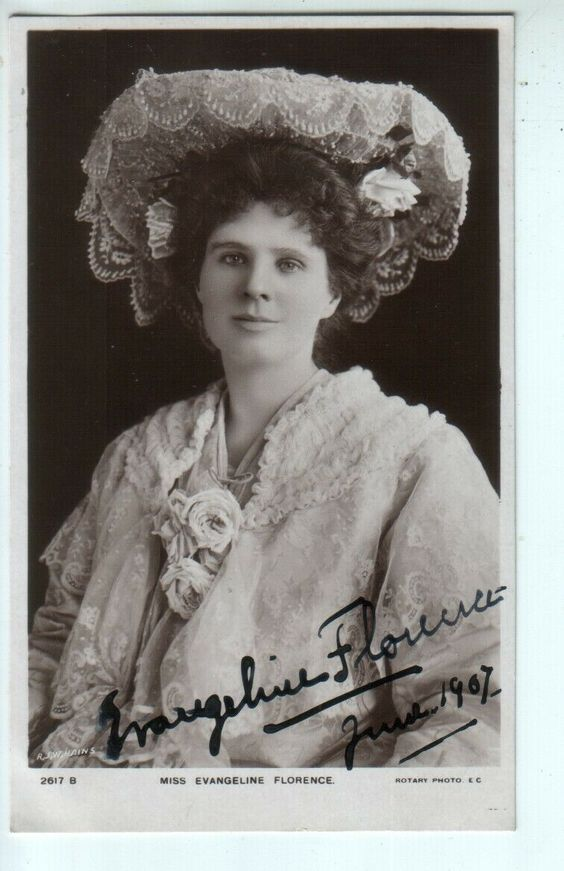
Evangeline Florence in 1907

Evangeline Florence (12 December 1867 – 1 November 1928) was an American-born soprano who built a successful concert career in Great Britain.

== Early life ==
Born as Florence Angeline Houghton in Cambridge, Massachusetts, the daughter of Julia Maria née Rowell (1841-1871) and Henry Houghton (1832-1896), from West Gardiner, Maine who worked as a cooper, she was taught by Edna Hall in Boston and Amelia Lehmann in London. In March 1888 she appeared as Evangeline Houghton in La sonnambula in Boston Music Hall under the direction of Charles R. Adams. In March 1889 aged 21 she was Lady Harriet Durham in Flotow's Martha at the Odd Fellows' Hall at Winter Hill in Somerville, Massachusetts. In November 1890 Houghton took part in the 12th annual festival of the South Eastern Massachusetts Musical Association, directed by Carl Zerrahn. In November 1890 ‘Miss Evangeline Houghton, Assisted by Her Three Brothers, Vocalists, and Orchestra of Six Pieces’ sang at Piedmont Church.

== Move to London ==
On arriving in Great Britain she dropped her surname to prevent confusion with another singer of the same name in London at that time. Florence studied in London with George Henschel, Blume, Alberto Randegger and Amelia Lehmann. She made her London concert début at St James's Hall on 11 May 1892. In the reviews the critics were appreciative of her high notes, recording: ‘the reports concerning the phenomenal compass of her voice proved to be in no way exaggerated. Whether this young lady’s highest notes are absolutely pleasant to listen to is another matter. For our own part, we prefer her singing when she remains within the limits of reasonable compass. All the rest savours too much of claptrap. Her voice is very pleasant in quality and she possesses great ease of execution’. Another wrote ‘In the cadenza of Alyabyev’s 'The Nightingale' she proved that she possessed a voice of extreme compass. Otherwise there is nothing remarkable about her voice’. Also in 1892 she sang 'Elsa's Dream' at Henschel's London Symphony Concerts, and in 1893 she appeared in Parry's oratorio Job, given by the Highbury Society and at the Popular Concerts, the London Ballad concerts and the Crystal Palace Concerts. Variously she was billed as ‘the sensational American soprano’, ‘the new high soprano’, and as ‘the Eiffel soprano’. In 1894 Florence sang at the Hereford Festival, while in 1895 she made a 30-concert tour through Australia and toured Europe during late 1898 and early 1899. In 1896 and 1898 she sang in the Promenade Concert under the baton of Henry Wood while in 1897 and 1900 she was at the Birmingham Festival and appeared frequently with the Royal Philharmonic Society and Royal Choral Society. In February 1898 she put on her own concert at St James's Hall in which she sang Mozart and Brahms, among others. In 1902 she appeared again at The Proms. For many years she was the principal soprano at Boosey's London Ballad Concerts.

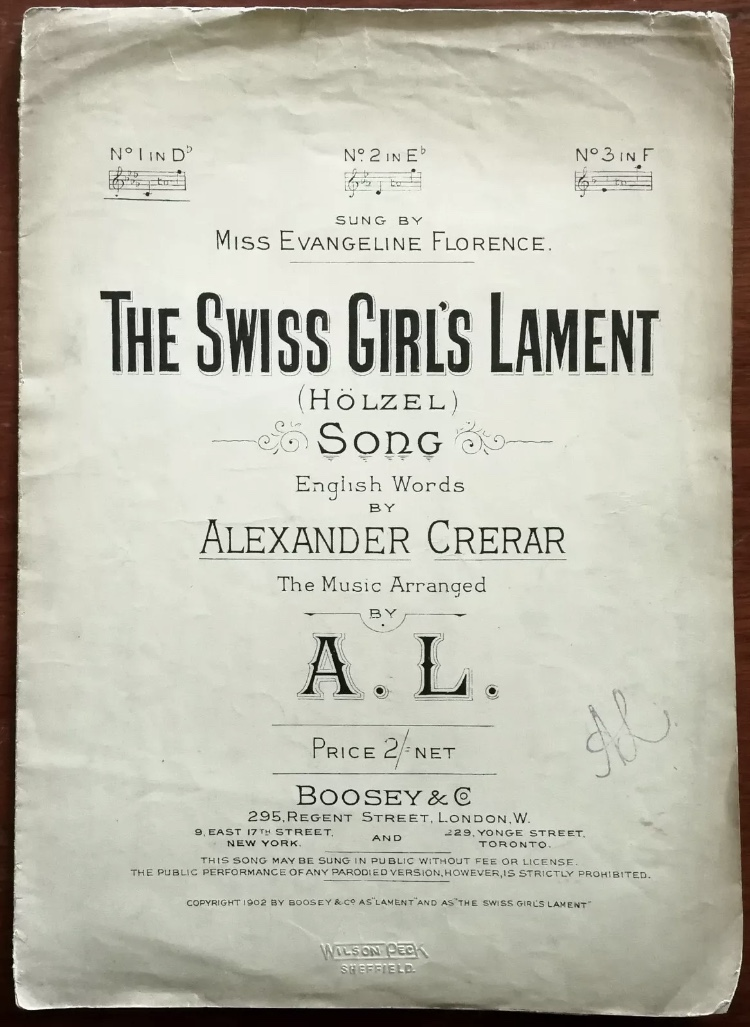
Sheet music to 'The Swiss Girl's Lament' (1902) - sung by Florence to words by her husband

While in London she gained a solid reputation as a concert soprano, a genre she cultivated almost exclusively until her retirement. The extent of her voice was extraordinary, exceeding three or four notes in the treble register of the celebrated Adelina Patti. In 1902 her husband Alexander Crerar provided the English words (the original lyrics were by Gustav Hölzel) to the song 'The Swiss Girl's Lament' to music by 'A. L.'. Published as sheet music it was sung by Florence. In 1910 she sang the soprano part in Handel's Allegro at the Savoy Theatre in London. By 1916 her concert career was diminishing and she turned to teaching voice and recorded several records; however, in that year she appeared with Thomas Harrison Frewin’s Opera Company in Faust and Rigoletto.

== Personal life ==
On 17 October 1894 she married Scottish commission merchant Alexander Crerar (1856-1926) in Somerville, Massachusetts. By 1901 the couple were living at 59 Wynnstay Gardens in Kensington; while in 1911 they were living at 29 Kensington Park Gardens in Kensington in London; this was to be her home for the rest of her life.

Evangeline Florence Crerar died in Kensington in London in 1928. In her will she left £561 2s 9d, approximately equivalent to £42,710 in 2023.
