= Gertrude Eaton =

British musician and suffragist (1864–1940)

- Born: 1861; Swansea, Wales
- Died: 8 March 1939 (aged 77–78); Hampstead, England
- Occupations: Singer, composer
- Known for: Society of Women Musicians

Gertrude Eaton (1864 – 8 March 1939) was a Welsh singer, and co-founder of the Society of Women Musicians. She was also active as a suffragist, and on the issue of prison reform.

== Early life and education ==
Gertrude Eaton was born in 1864, in Swansea, the fifth daughter of businessman and magistrate Robert Eaton of Bryn-y-mor, and his wife Helen. The Eatons were a prominent family; the imposing Bryn-y-mor was built by an ancestor in the eighteenth century.

Eaton studied music in Italy, and from 1894 to 1897 at the Royal College of Music.

== Career ==
In 1911, Eaton co-founded the Society of Women Musicians with composers Katharine Emily Eggar and Marion Scott. The first meeting was held in October 1911, when Eaton was elected treasurer; she also spoke at that first meeting. She served a term as president of the Society from 1916 to 1917.

Gertrude Eaton was also active on the issues of suffrage and prison reform, and served a term as president of the Howard League for Penal Reform. Eaton used her musical training to teach fellow activists to use their voices for confident public speaking. As secretary of the Women's Tax Resistance League, in summer 1911, her household silver was seized when she refused to pay taxes as a suffrage protest. She also evaded the census in 1911 as part of an organized suffrage protest. She was said to be "instrumental" in getting penal reform on the agenda of the League of Nations. Eaton was one of the British delegates to the Women's International League for Peace and Freedom meeting in Zurich, Switzerland in 1919.

Eaton died on 8 March 1939, aged 77 or 78, at Hampstead. Her colleague Margery Fry wrote in an obituary of Eaton, "She would take endless pains to help a cause or an individual when her sympathy was aroused."
