= Anton Bauer (official) =

Court Administrator of Liechtenstein from 1734 to 1747

Court Administrator of Liechtenstein
- In office 1734–1747
- Monarch: Johann Nepomuk Karl
- Preceded by: Franz Anton Keller (As Landvogt)
- Succeeded by: Johann Erwin von Keil (As Landvogt)

Personal details
- Spouse: Anna Maria Gapp

Anton Bauer was the Court Administrator of Liechtenstein (Landvogt) from 1734 to 1747.

He was the administrator of Vaduz from 1725. During this time, he frequently conflicted with the Landvogts Johann Erwin von Keil and Franz Anton Keller. After Keller was dismissed from office in 1734, Bauer was appointed as the court administrator and held effectively the same duties, which he held until 1747 when a new Landvogt, Johann Erwin von Keil, was appointed. He died at some point after January 1749.
