= Peter Pokorny (official) =

Landvogt of Liechtenstein from 1827 to 1833

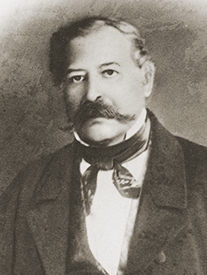

Landvogt of Liechtenstein
- In office 1 February 1827 – 30 June 1833
- Monarch: Johann I Joseph
- Preceded by: Josef Schuppler
- Succeeded by: Michael Menzinger

Personal details
- Born: 4 October 1795 Bučovice, Moravia
- Died: 1866 (aged 70–71)
- Spouse: Antonia Walter
- Children: 5

Peter Pokorny (4 October 1795 – 1866) was an Austrian civil servant and legal advisor to the House of Liechtenstein. He served as Landvogt of Liechtenstein from 1827 to 1833; his time in office was marked by civil office registry reform and centralization, but he was considered an unpopular official who did not understand the concerns of the Liechtenstein population.

== Life ==
Pokorny was born on 4 October 1795 in Bučovice, Moravia. He studied law and then was a legal trainee in Rabensburg. He was the chief administrator of an estate owned by the House of Kinsky from 1820 until he became a legal advisor to the House of Liechtenstein in 1822, serving at the estate in Sternberg (now Šternberk).

On 1 February 1827, Pokorny was appointed as Landvogt, the head of the Liechtenstein district office (Oberamt), having been introduced to the position by his predecessor Josef Schuppler. His time in office was characterized by reforming the district office's registry, the establishment of a Liechtenstein school law in 1827, and the establishment of a permeant police force in 1828 consisting of two officers. In 1829, he reported to Johann I Joseph, Prince of Liechtenstein of poverty in the principality and suggested the establishment of a poor house, but this did not take place until 1845.

Pokorny was an unpopular official and was considered an ambitious yet arrogant official who looked down on the Liechtenstein population and did not understand their concerns. In 1827 he controversially placed civil registration under state control, which had previously been conducted by local parishes. In addition, he introduced a tax on salt in 1830, which despite being unpopular introduced a significant source of state income. In March 1831, in order to meet military obligations to the German Confederation, Pokorny introduced conscription for the military of Liechtenstein. This resulted in significant unrest when the municipalities refused to provide troops and then population sent a petition to Johann I Joseph to have Pokorny removed from office. Pokorny, who was unable to stop the unrest, reported to Johann I Joseph that a rebellion may happen and twice requested his transfer from office. In response, in February 1832 Johann I Joseph threatened to invade his principality with Austrian troops, and in August imposed a decree threatening severe punishments for incitement; due to this, the unrest was ultimately quelled.

In July 1833, Pokorny was appointed as the a civil judge and captain of the castle in the Duchy of Troppau. As such, after introducing his successor Michael Menzinger to the role, he left office on 30 June 1833. He was the Burgrave of Jägerndorf (now Krnov) from 1834 to 1835, and then from 1847 the chief magistrate of Rumburg (now Rumburk). He retired in 1860 and died in 1866.
