= Robert Fischhof =

Austrian pianist, composer, and professor

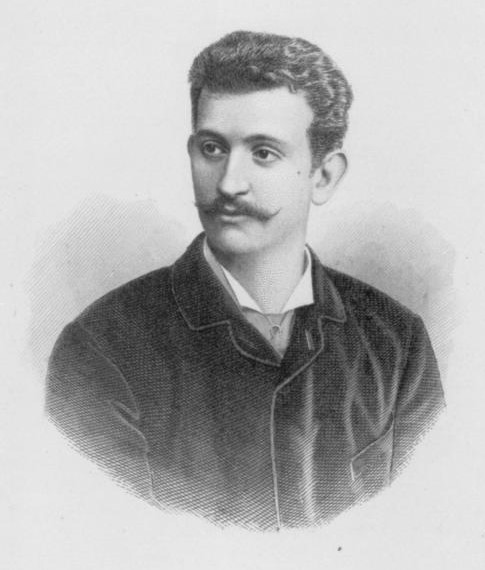
Robert Fischhof

Robert Fischhof (31 October 1856 – 31 March 1918) was a pianist, composer, and professor at the Vienna Music Conservatoire.

== Biography ==
Robert Fischhof was born in Vienna to Julius Fischhof, a successful Austrian banker, and Louise Fischhof (née Strakosch), who had been trained as a pianist by Clara Schumann, the famous performer and wife of composer Robert Schumann. The Fischhof home in Vienna was a well-known center for celebrated musicians, composers and singers arriving from all over the world.

Fischhof had musical uncles: his father was the youngest brother of Joseph Fischhof, who became Professor of Piano at the Vienna Conservatoire in 1833; and his mother's brother was Maurice Strakosch, also an excellent pianist, who later became a vocal instructor and international impresario working with the soprano Adelina Patti.

Fischhof started his piano studies at the age of five under the supervision of his mother. Later, at the Conservatoire of Vienna, he was taught piano technique by Anton Door and composition by Anton Bruckner and Franz Krenn. After completing his courses at the Conservatoire, he continued his piano studies with Theodor Leschetitzky and Franz Liszt.

Fischhof made his debut at age seventeen, and toured almost uninterruptedly for several years, playing concerts in Europe under the direction of celebrated musicians such as Abt, Dessof, Reinecke and Gade. He also performed for Emperor Franz Josef in Vienna, for Emperor Friedrich III in Berlin, for King Christian of Denmark, and for King Oscar of Sweden in Stockholm. All his concerts were organized by his brother, impresario Alfred Fischhof.

In 1884 Fischhof was appointed Professor for the class of finished pianists at the Vienna Conservatoire, a position he held until his death.

In later years as a pianist, Fischhof performed only his own compositions in public. His many compositions include: a piano concerto, two violin sonatas, the Variations for Two Pianos, and at least one opera, "Ingeborg", which was premiered in Graz in 1904. In addition to his native German, he spoke French, English and Italian fluently.

In 1916, Fischhof wrote Begegnungen auf meinem Lebensweg ("Encounters In My Life") about Brahms, Gustav Mahler, Pablo de Sarasate, Edvard Grieg, Charles Gounod, Camille Saint-Saëns, Leoncavallo, Alexander Dumas, Guy de Maupassant and Émile Zola and other people involved in public life, opera and the theater. It was published by Hugo Heller in Vienna.

Fischhof died on 31 March 1918 and is buried in Vienna.

== Sources ==
- Celebrated pianists of the past and present written by A. Ehrlich, Philadelphia: Theodor Presser, 1894
- Begegnungen auf meinem Lebensweg by Robert Fischhof, Vienna: Hugo Heller, 1916
