= Joseph Fischhof =

Pianist, composer, professor (1804–1857)

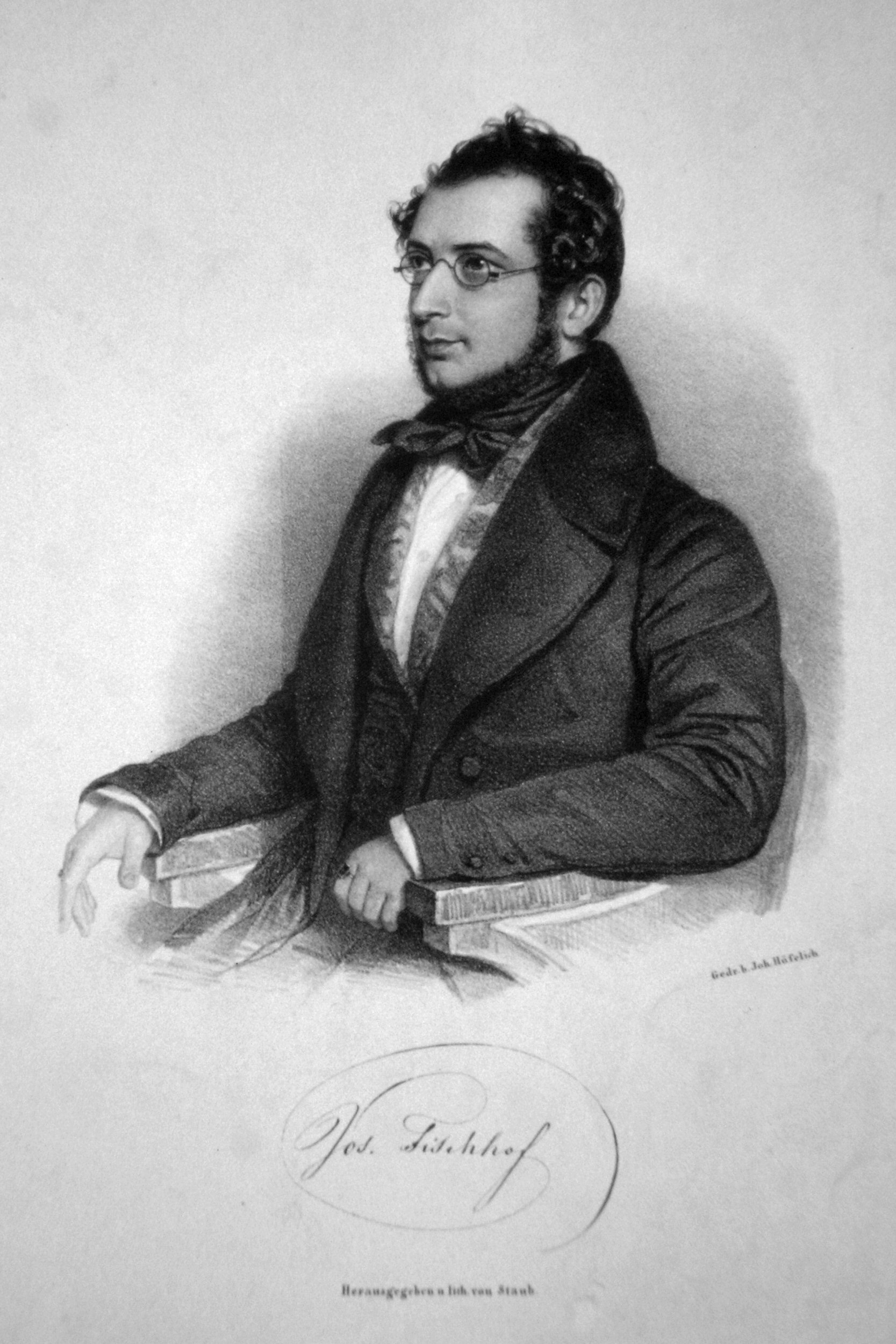
Joseph Fischhof, lithograph by Andreas Staub, ca. 1840

Joseph Fischhof (4 April 1804 – 28 June 1857) was a pianist, composer and professor at the Vienna Conservatory of Music, belonging to the Romantic school.

== Life and career ==
Fischhof was born into a Jewish family in Bučovice, Moravia. He planned to become a medical doctor, but later studied music and composition under Ignaz von Seyfried, and in 1833 became Professor of Piano at the Vienna Conservatory. He was the uncle of composer Robert Fischhof.

Fischhof published a number of literary works on music and was a collector of Beethoven scores and manuscripts which became important for biographers. A copy by Jacob Hotchevar of Beethoven documents previously lost was given to him, and later became known as the Fischhof Manuscript. Notable students include George Lichtestein. Fischhof died in Vienna.
