= Katharine Emily Eggar =

English composer (1874–1961)

Katherine Emily Eggar (5 January 1874 – 15 August 1961) was an English pianist and composer. Eggar was born and died in London, England, the daughter of Thomas Eggar and Katherine MacDonald. Eggar was active member of the feminist movement especially in terms of opportunities for women in music. At the inaugural meeting of the Society of Women Musicians, Eggar stated, "The conventions of music must be challenged. Women are already challenging conventions in all kinds of ways… We believe in a great future for women composers." (Katherine Emily Eggar, at the inaugural meeting in 1911 of the Society of Women Musicians which she helped found)

== Life ==
She studied piano in Berlin at the Klindworth-Scharwenka Conservatory with Klindworth, Brussels at the Conservatoire Royal de Musique with De Greef, and London, and studied composition with Frederick Corder at the Royal Academy of Music, Graduating in 1895. At 19 she became the first woman to perform her own chamber works at a London public concert.

With singer Gertrude Eaton and musicologist Marion M. Scott, she co-founded the Society of Women Musicians in London in 1911 and served as its president in 1914–1915. Eggar ran fortnightly meetings for women composers in the Society. With Marion Scott, she wrote a column in the Chamber Music (a supplement to the periodical The Music Student) called "Women's Doings in Chamber Music."

Eggar was also a Shakespeare archivist and the author of the pamphlets "Shakespeare in His True Colors" (1951) and "The Unlifted Shadow" (1954). She later bequeathed her 253 volume collection to Senate House Library of the University of London. Eggar also spent over thirty years researching the life of Edward de Vere, 17th Earl of Oxford, and believed Lord Oxford to be the real author of Shakespeare's work. She planned to publish her writings, but she died before the preparatory work for her book could be made.

She was a chairman of the Society of Women Musicians. In an opening address, "she expressed the conviction that a strong body of high-principled women musicians might do a great deal to reform public opinion on music and raise the standard of musical politics." She was very aware of the disadvantages of female composers and musicians, and actively worked to create opportunities for women in the realm of music.

In the 1950s, Katharine Eggar was living at 40c Palace Road, Westminster, London.

A photo of Eggar is included prefacing a 2022 YouTube video, in which Professors Michele Bozzi, flautist, and Oriella Caianiello, pianist, perform Eggar's Idyll for flute and piano; both musicians teach at the Conservatorio di Musica Niccolo Piccinni of Bari, Italy. Another photo can be found in the June 2008 edition of Signature: Women in Music. In the photo, Eggar is seated alongside Liza Lehmann and Marion M. Scott, respectively the President and a co-founder, with Eggar, of the SWM. Other members of the SWM also appear.

== Works ==
Eggar composed songs and chamber music. Selected works include:

Chamber

- Piano Quartet in D minor and major, 1906
- Piano Trio in G minor, 1905
- Rhapsodic Impression for violin, viola and piano, 1928
- String Quartet, 1931
- Cello Sonata in C minor
- Suite for cello and piano: Prelude, ballade, landler, finale, 1908
- Idyll for flute and piano, 1910

Piano

- Legends of the Norse Gods: Wodin, Thor, Freia, Seater, Sun, Moon, Tiu
- A Tarantella, 1914
- Four characteristic sketches: The Old Castle, The Wishing Well, Romance, At the Fair.
- Moonrise, 1906
- Sun in Springtime, 1935
- Duets for Fun- eight short pieces for child and pianist, 1934

Voice and Instruments

- I must go down to the sea tonight', scena for baritone and small orchestra
- My Soul is an enchanted boat' words by Percy Bysshe Shelley for voice and piano quintet, or piano and organ.
- Trios: 'Autumn Leaves', 'May Wind' for first and second sopranos and alto with accompaniment of piano quartet (also arranged for female choir and piano), 1909
- Pan in a City Stone' for soprano, baritone, with flute and piano accompaniment

Six songs from Forbes 'Cantus, and I Fancies' (17thC.)

Voice and Piano

- Hope of Spring, two part songs for female voices or soprano and baritone with piano
- Wolfram's Dirge' with piano and cello ad lib words by Thomas Lovell Beddoes, Cycle of Gaelic love lyrics, 1906
- Curtsy to the Moon, words by H Taylor, 1906
- Old Gaelic lullaby
- A Fairy Barcarolle' (A lake and a fairy boat) words by Thomas Hood, 1920
- May Wind' for three voices and piano, 1909
- The Purple Moors, 1908
- Red Clover
- Remember me, my Dear' from Forbes 'Cantus, songs and fancies' 1682- one of six, 1909
- Song of the Vagabond
- The Holly Bough and the Misletoe – A Christmas Carol words by W E Grogan
