= Society of Women Musicians =

The Society of Women Musicians was a British group founded in 1911 for mutual cooperation between women composers and performers, in response to the limited professional opportunities for women musicians at the time. The founders included Katharine Emily Eggar, a composer, Marion Scott, a musicologist, and Gertrude Eaton, a singer. 37 women came to the first meeting, held on 11 July 1911 at the Women's Institute, 92 Victoria Street, including Rebecca Helferich Clarke, Alma Haas, and Liza Lehmann, who later became the group's first president.

The first concert was held on 25 January 1912 in the small room of Queen's Hall. Regular concerts followed at the same venue, at the Aeolian and Wigmore Halls, and (from 1920) at 74 Grosvenor Street. They featured premieres from women composers such as Ethel Barns, Rebecca Clarke, Katharine Eggar, Kalitha Dorothy Fox, Dorothy Howell, Liza Lehmann, Fiona McCleary (1900–1986), Marion Scott, Elna Sherman, and Ethel Smyth. In later years there were also premieres from Ruth Gipps, Elisabeth Lutyens, Elizabeth Maconchy and Elizabeth Poston.

The group had a number of influential musicians as presidents, including Cécile Chaminade, Astra Desmond, Alma Goatley, Myra Hess, Rosa Newmarch, Evelyn Suart and Elizabeth Poston. The post of vice-president was largely honorary, and was held by woman musicians such as Nadia Boulanger, Imogen Holst, Elisabeth Lutyens, Elizabeth Maconchy and Fanny Waterman.

Although the group was aimed at women, men were not excluded, and were included in the membership and attended conferences. Male members included Thomas Dunhill and Walter Willson Cobbett. Theodore Holland attended a concert of his recent songs held by the Society on 28 October 1947, the day before his death.

Activities included collecting a library, starting a choir and orchestra which gave public and private concerts of works by members of the Society, lectures, and a composers conference. The Society was also active in advocating for professional women musicians in symphony orchestras.

The Society disbanded in 1972, and its archives were given to the Royal College of Music.
