= Liza Lehmann =

English soprano and composer (1862–1918)

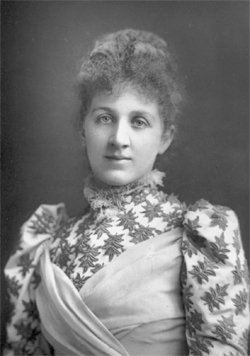
Liza Lehmann, c. 1889

Elisabetha Nina Mary Frederica Lehmann (11 July 1862 – 19 September 1918) was an English soprano and composer, known for her vocal compositions.

After vocal studies with Alberto Randegger and Jenny Lind, and composition studies with teachers including Hamish MacCunn, Lehmann made her singing debut in 1885 in London and pursued a concert career for nearly a decade. In 1894, she married and left the stage. She then concentrated on composing music, becoming known for her songs, including many children's songs. She also composed several pieces for the stage and wrote a textbook on singing. In 1910, she toured the United States, where she accompanied her own songs in recitals. She was the first president of the Society of Women Musicians and became a professor of singing at the Guildhall School of Music in 1913.

== Biography ==
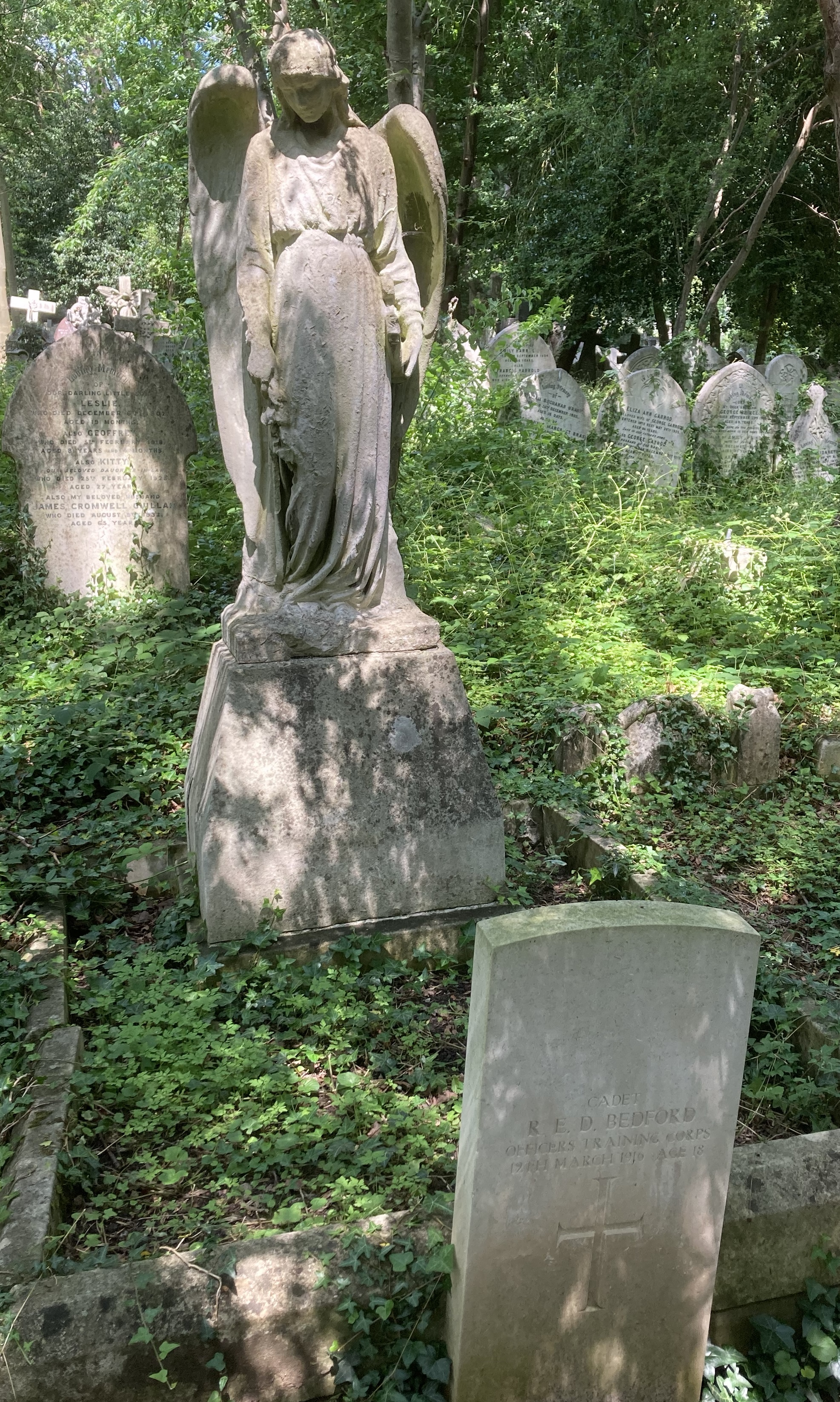
The Lehmann family grave in Highgate Cemetery

Lehmann was born in London. Her father was the German painter Rudolf Lehmann, and her mother was Amelia (A.L.) Chambers, a music teacher, composer and arranger. Lehmann "grew up in an intellectual and artistic atmosphere" and lived in Germany, France and Italy in her early years. She studied singing in London with both Alberto Randegger and Jenny Lind, and her composition teachers included Hamish MacCunn in London, Niels Raunkilde in Rome, and Wilhelm Freudenberg in Wiesbaden.

On 23 November 1885, Lehmann made her singing debut at a Monday Popular Concert at St James's Hall, and spent the next nine years performing many important concert engagements in England. She received encouragement from important European musicians such as Joseph Joachim and Clara Schumann. She retired from the stage after a final concert at St James's Hall on 14 July 1894, married the composer and illustrator Herbert Bedford and turned to composing music. In 1910, Lehmann made a tour of the United States, where she accompanied her own songs in recitals. She became the first president of the Society of Women Musicians in 1911 and 1912. She was also a professor of singing at the Guildhall School of Music in 1913. The same year, she wrote a voice study text, Practical Hints for Students of Singing.

Lehmann and Bedford had two sons; the older one, Rudolf, died in training during the First World War, and the younger, Leslie Herbert Bedford (1900–1989), was an inventor who played a key role in the development of radar. Leslie was the father of the conductor Steuart Bedford and the composer David Bedford. Lehmann completed her memoirs in 1918 and died, shortly after completing them, at Pinner, Middlesex, at the age of 56. She is buried in a family grave on the east side of Highgate Cemetery with her husband and father.

== Music ==
After her performing career ended in 1894, Lehmann concentrated on composing music for the rest of her life. She completed one of her best known works two years later, in 1896, the song cycle for four voices and piano titled In a Persian Garden, settings of selected quatrains from Edward FitzGerald's version of the Rubāiyāt of Omar Khayyām. She composed many more song cycles including: The Daisy Chain (1893), children's songs for vocal quartet; In Memoriam (1899), setting Alfred Lord Tennyson's "In Memoriam A.H.H."; and Bird Songs (1907), with words attributed to "A.S.", thought to have been Alice Sayers, the family nurse. She became known for her art songs, parlour songs and other works in the following years. Many of her songs are for children, ranging from the sweet and trivial "There are fairies at the bottom of our garden" to the melodically and harmonically passionate "Stars" in The Daisy-Chain. Her tenor song "Ah, moon of my delight" from In a Persian Garden has been recorded through the years by tenors such as John McCormack, Jan Peerce, Mario Lanza, Robert White, and Webster Booth.

In 1904 she was commissioned by Frank Curzon to compose the score for the Edwardian musical comedy Sergeant Brue, with a libretto by Owen Hall and lyrics by James Hickory Wood. The piece was a success in London and New York, but Lehmann was unhappy that Curzon added other composers' music to her score. Although she refused to write any further musicals, Lehmann composed the score for a comic opera adaptation of The Vicar of Wakefield in 1906, with a libretto by Laurence Housman. This piece was a modest success but did not lead to further comic operas. In 1916, she returned to writing for the stage, with the score for the opera Everyman, which was produced by the Beecham Opera Company.

Lehmann, Ethel Smyth and Maude Valérie White were England's foremost female composers of songs at the beginning of the 20th century. Although they all composed solo settings of serious texts, Lehmann and White excelled in setting lighter material. Some of Lehmann's compositional practices, such as her frequent writing of four-voice cycles and writing piano links between songs, were consistent with her time. Although her pieces were inventive, they are now often overlooked and disregarded.

== Musical works ==
=== Stage ===
- Sergeant Brue, musical farce (London, 14 June 1904)
- The Vicar of Wakefield, light opera (Manchester, 12 November 1906)
- Everyman, 1-act opera (London, 28 December 1915)

=== Vocal with orchestra ===
- Young Lochinvar, text by Walter Scott, baritone, chorus, and orchestra (1898)
- Endymion, text by Longfellow, soprano and orchestra (1899)
- Once Upon a Time, cantata (London, 22 February 1903)
- The Golden Threshold, text by S. Naidu, S, A, T, Bar, chorus, and orchestra (1906)
- Leaves from Ossian, cantata (1909)

=== Vocal quartets with piano ===
- The Daisy-Chain (L. Alma-Tadema, R.L. Stevenson and others) (1893)
- In a Persian Garden (E. FitzGerald, after O. Khayyām) (1896)
- More Daisies (1902)
- Nonsense Songs (from L. Carroll: Alice in Wonderland) (1908)
- Breton Folk-Songs (F.M. Gostling) (1909)
- Prairie Pictures (Lehmann) (1911)
- Parody Pie (1914)

=== Songs for solo voice ===
- Mirage (H. Malesh) (1894)
- Nine English Songs (1895)
- Eight German Songs (1888)
- Twelve German Songs (1889)
- In memoriam (Tennyson) (1899)
- Cameos: Five Greek Love-Songs (1901)
- Five French Songs (G. Boutelleau, F. Plessis) (1901)
- To a Little Red Spider (L.A. Cunnington) (1903)
- The Life of a Rose (L. Lehmann) (1905)
- Bird Songs (A.S.) (1907)
- Mr. Coggs and Other Songs for Children (E.V. Lucas) (1908)
- Liza Lehmann Album (1909)
- Five Little Love Songs (C. Fabbri) (1910)
- Oh, tell me Nightingale (Mirza Shafi Vazeh) (1910)
- Songs of a ‘Flapper’ (Lehmann) (1911)
- Cowboy Ballads (J.A. Lomax) (1912)
- The Well of Sorrow (H. Vacaresco: The Bard of the Dimbovitza) (1912)
- Five Tenor Songs (1913)
- Hips and Haws (M. Radclyffe Hall) (1913)
- Songs of Good Luck (Superstitions) (H. Taylor) (1913)
- Magdalen at Michael’s Gate (H. Kingsley) (1913)
- By the Lake (Ethel Clifford) (1914)
- The Poet and the Nightingale (J.T. White) (1914)
- The Lily of a Day (Jonson) (1917)
- There are Fairies at the Bottom of Our Garden (R. Fyleman) (1917)
- When I am Dead, My Dearest (C. Rossetti) (1918)
- Three Songs for Low Voice (Meredith, Browning) (1922)

=== Other vocal works ===
- Music, When Soft Voices Die (Percy Bysshe Shelley), voice and piano
- The Secrets of the Heart (H. Austin Dobson), soprano, alto, and piano (1895)
- Good-Night, Babette! (Austin Dobson), soprano, baritone, violin, 'cello, and piano (1898)
- The Eternal Feminine (monologue, L. Eldée) (1902)
- Songs of Love and Spring (E. Geibel), alto, baritone, and piano (1903)
- The Happy Prince, melodrama (recitation, O. Wilde) (1908)
- Four Cautionary Tales and a Moral (Hilaire Belloc), two voices and piano (1909)
- Four Shakespearean Part-Songs (1911)
- The Selfish Giant (recitation, Wilde), 1911
- The High Tide (recitation, J. Ingelow) (1912)
- Behind the Nightlight (J. Maude, N. Price) (1913)
- Three Snow Songs (Lehmann), solo voice, piano, organ, female chorus (1914)

=== Instrumental ===
- Romantic Suite, violin and piano (1903)
- Cobweb Castle, piano solo (1908)

== Writings ==
- The Life of Liza Lehmann, by Herself (T Fisher Unwin, London, 1919)
- Practical Hints for Students of Singing (Enoch & Sons, 1913)

== See also ==
- Stern, Susan (1978), Women Composers: A Handbook, Metuchen, New Jersey: The Scarecrow Press, Inc., pp. 109, ISBN 0-8108-1138-3
