= Schloss Rohrau =

Castle in the town of Rohrau in Lower Austria

Coordinates: 48.0625°N 16.8519°E

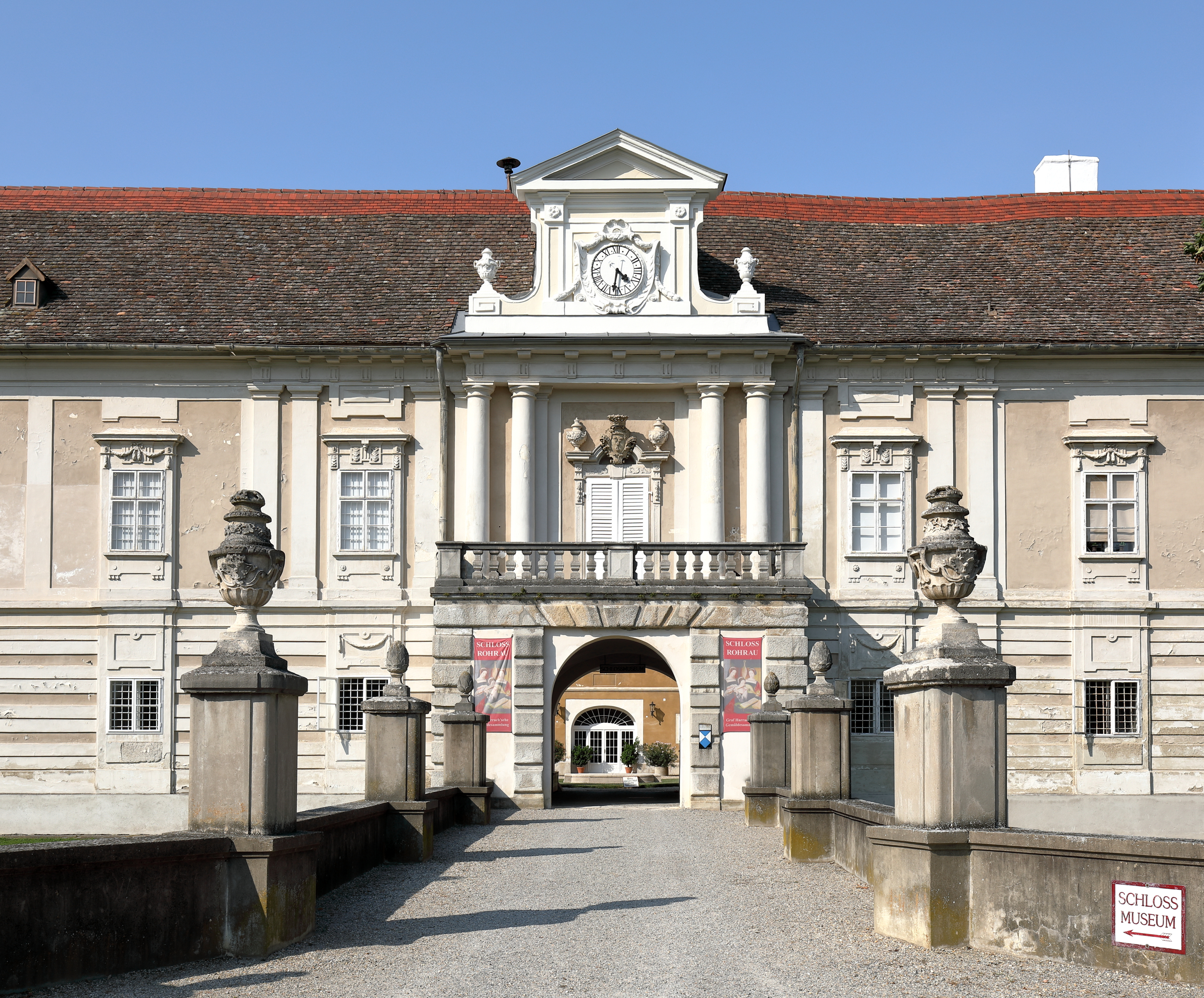

General information
- Location: Rohrau, Austria

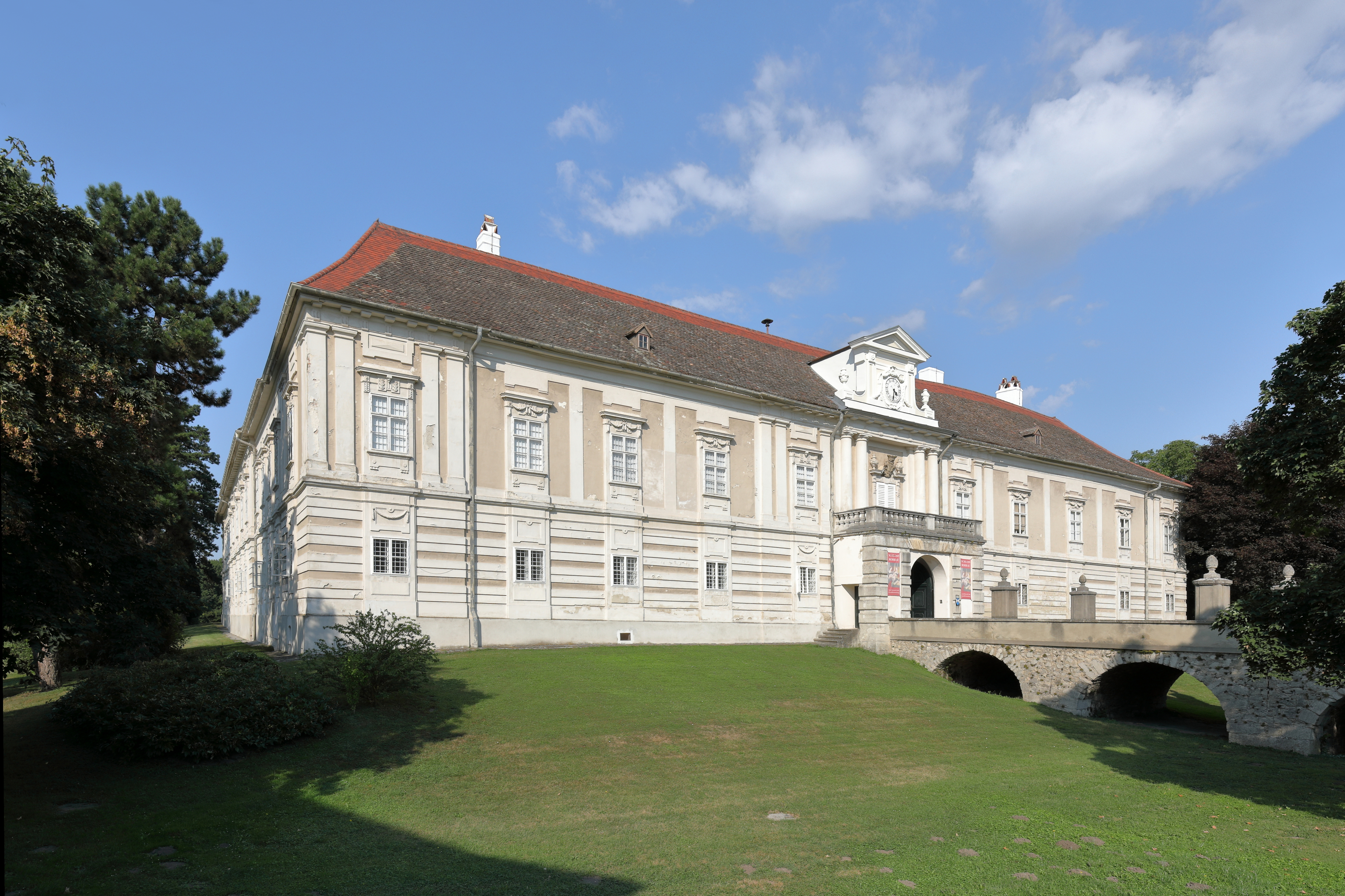
East view

Schloss Rohrau is a castle in the town of Rohrau in Lower Austria, bordering on Burgenland. The building houses the art collection of the counts of Harrach.

== Medieval castle and dominion ==
Agnes of Poitou (d. 1077), the widow of Emperor Henry III, gave some lands, which extended from Petronell-Carnuntum on the Danube to Rohrau, to Count Palatine Rapoto V of Bavaria from the Counts of Vohburg, who died in 1099. At the beginning of the 12th century his descendent Diepold III, Margrave of Vohburg, gave the lands to Hugo von Liechtenstein (d. 1156) who had come to Austria in his knightly entourage. Hugo built Liechtenstein Castle about 45 km to the west on a fief that he received from the Babenberg margraves of Austria and named himself after it. He was the progenitor of the House of Liechtenstein, the ruling family of the Principality of Liechtenstein. Petronell and Rohrau, which became his own property in 1142 from feudal property, remained important Liechtenstein seats in the High Middle Ages.

Dietrich de Rorow, a member of the Liechtenstein family, was the first to be mentioned under this name in 1240. His line died out in 1278 with Dietrich III. His daughter Diemut married Leutold I von Stadeck († 1292/95). After the death of the last Johann Stadeck in 1399, Duke Wilhelm wanted to give it to his brother Ernst dem Eisernen, but heiress Guta married Hermann II, Count of Celje and received it from King Wenceslaus IV of Bohemia as a gift. In 1402, Rohrau came into the hands of Ulrich, son of Hugo von Montfort-Pfannberg, who inherited from Guta. In 1404, King Ruprecht gave the castle and dominion of Rohrau to the Counts of Montfort who owned it for 120 years.

== Harrach family ==
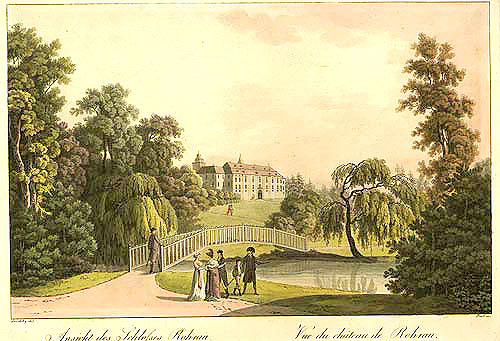
View of Schloss Rohrau (c. 1800)

The Harrach family first appeared in southern Bohemia in the 13th century, later in neighbouring Mühlviertel, including the wealthy town of Freistadt. The Harrachs owned estates in Styria and Carinthia at one time, but their main interests shifted to Vienna (see Palais Harrach) and Lower Austria.

Leonhard III von Harrach inherited the castle and in 1524, during the Counter-Reformation, his son Leonhard IV took the side of the Catholics. He was granted nobility in 1552 and, in 1584, the Order of the Golden Fleece. In 1586, he retired after 55 years of service to the court of Vienna and devoted himself to the Rohrau castle. He died in 1590 and was buried in the Augustinian Church, Vienna.

In 1593, the Turks stormed the castle. The damage was repaired in 1599–1605 and is documented in the family's archives.

== Art collection ==
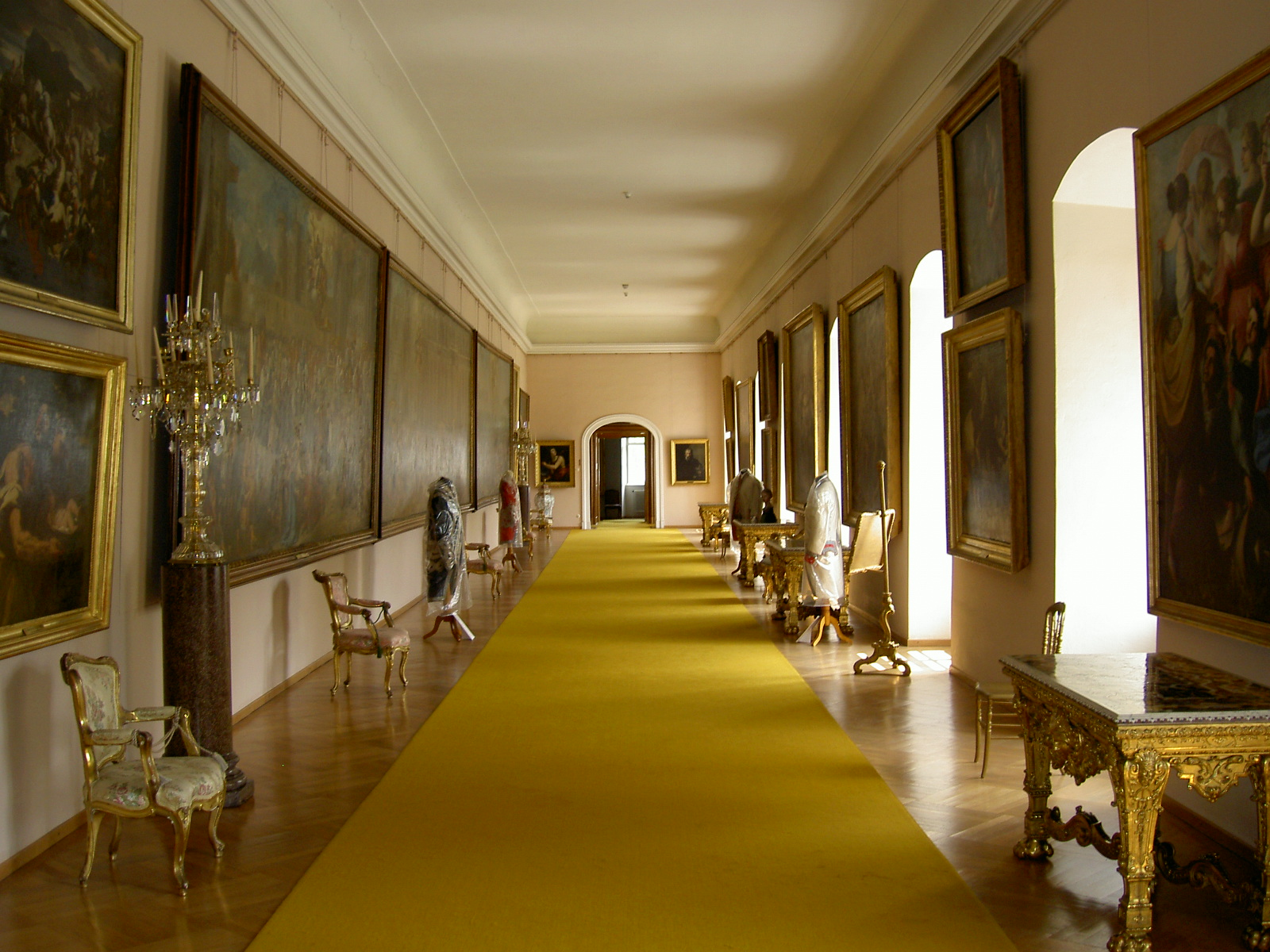
View of the picture gallery

The castle houses the Graf Harrach’sche Familiensammlung (Count Harrach family collection), one of the largest private picture collections in Austria. The Harrachs brought many magnificent paintings to Rohrau from Naples, Madrid, Rome, Paris and the Netherlands. In April 2006, thieves broke in and stole 16 paintings by Rembrandt, Van Dyck, Rubens and Peter Snayers.

The castle and its collection now belong by inheritance to the counts of Waldburg-Zeil. There are guided tours of the castle on Saturdays and Sundays, for groups at any time by prior arrangement.

== Literature ==
- Ulrich Graf von und zu Arco-Zinneberg, Schloss Rohrau - Graf Harrach'sche Familiensammlung, Kleiner Kunstführer, Verlag Schnell & Steiner, Regensburg; 4., neu bearbeitete Auflage 2012.
- Helmuth Furch, Das Gräflich Harrachsche Familienarchiv, Schloss Rohrau, Antonius Tencalla, Steinmetz im kayßerischen Steinbruch am Leyttaberg, in Mitteilungen des Museums- und Kulturvereines Kaisersteinbruch, Nr. 37, S 7–13, Juni 1995.
- Wolfgang Westerhoff, Prangersäulen in Österreich, Verlag NÖ-Pressehaus, 1994.
