= Haydn's birthplace =

- Haydn-Geburtshaus
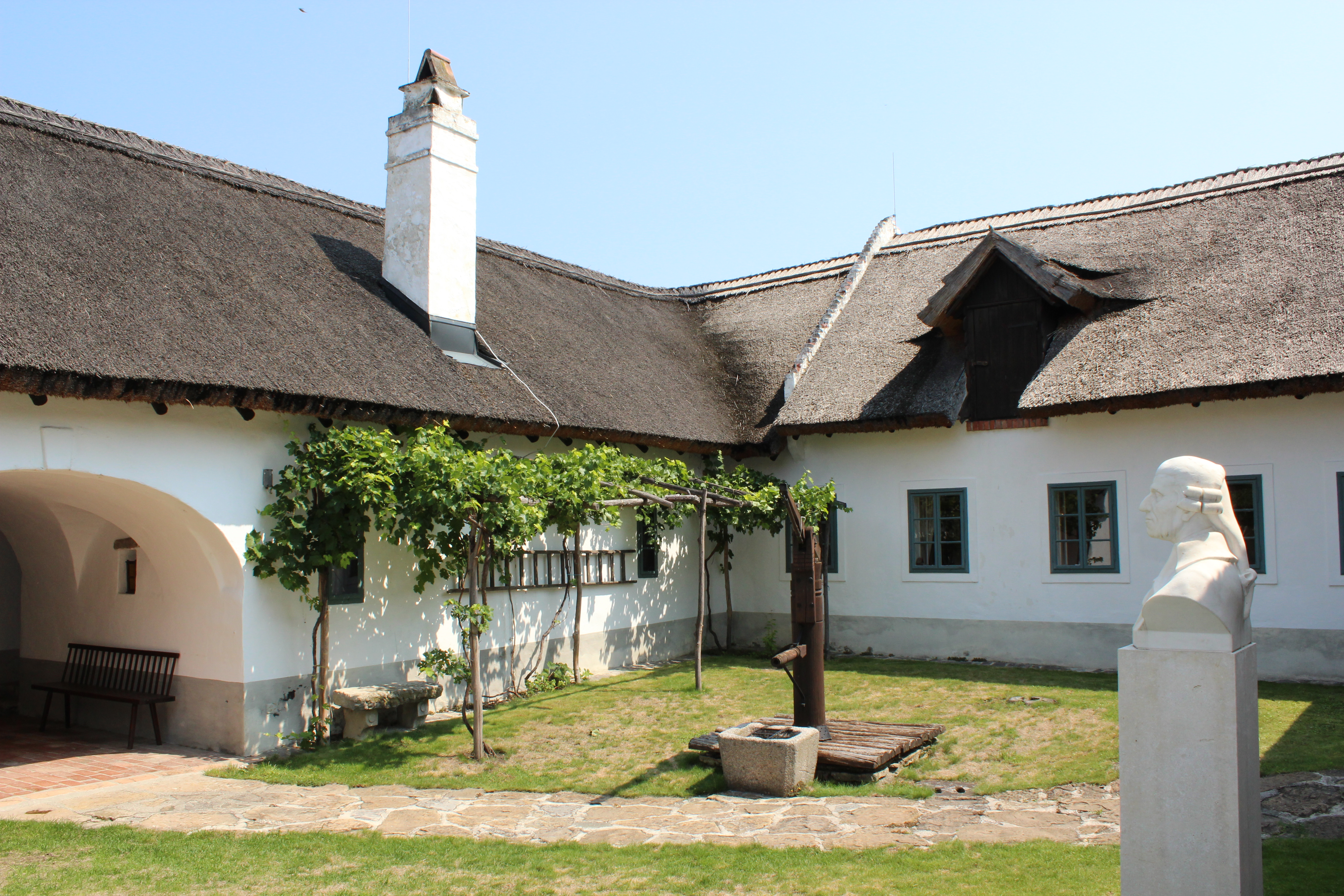
- Interactive map of the Haydn's birthplace area

General information
- Location: Obere Hauptstraße 25, Rohrau, Austria
- Coordinates: 48°3′54″N 16°51′20″E
- Completed: 1728

Website
- http://www.haydngeburtshaus.at/

Haydn's birthplace is in Rohrau in Lower Austria. The composer Joseph Haydn was born here in 1732. Today it is a museum.

== History ==
The farmhouse was built about 1728 by Matthias Haydn, a wheelwright and later a Marktrichter (village mayor). He and his wife Maria, who had been a cook in the service of Count Harrach, had several children, including Joseph Haydn, born on 31 March 1732, and his brother Michael, also a composer, born on 14 September 1737.

Joseph's parents recognized his musical ability, and he left home aged six to be educated in Hainburg and later in Vienna. However, he retained a fondness for his birthplace, revisiting it in 1795.

In 1958 the building was acquired by the State of Lower Austria, and it was restored to its original condition. In 1959, on the 150th anniversary of Haydn's death, it was opened as a museum. In 1982 the building was renovated, and the collection was rearranged. Some of the rooms have farm furniture from the time of the composer: these are from an old farmhouse in the nearby village of Schönabrunn, and from the Lower Austria Museum. The room which was originally Matthias's workshop documents the lives of Joseph and Michael Haydn.

== See also ==
- List of music museums
