= Ferdinand von Harrach =

German painter

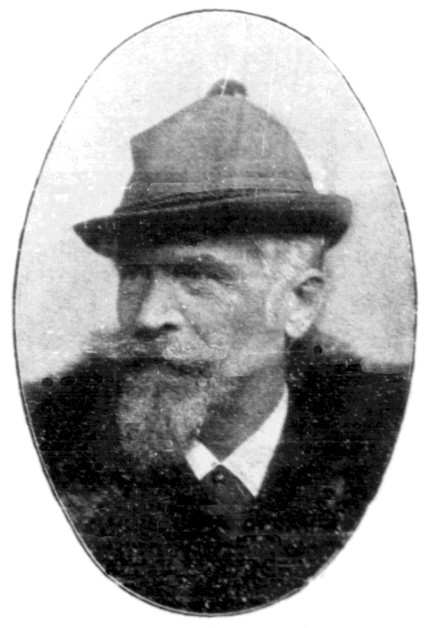
Ferdinand von Harrach (before 1902)

Count Ferdinand von Harrach zu Rohrau und Thannhausen (27 February 1832 – 13 February 1915) was a German aristocrat, landscape, history, and a portrait painter.

== Early life and ancestry ==
He was born in Rosnochau. By birth, he was a member of the Austrian noble Harrach family, which had been established in Bohemia since the beginning of the 14th century. Ferdinand Friedrich Wilhelm August Anna was born as the only son of Count Karl Philipp von Harrach zu Rohrau und Thannhausen (1795–1878), originally from Prague, who was engaged in agricultural pursuits in Upper Silesia by his first wife, Countess Theresia Sedlnitzky von Choltic (1810–1834). Patrilineally, he descended from Aloys Thomas Raimund, Count Harrach (1669–1742), who served as Viceroy of Naples, and Count Friedrich August von Harrach (1696–1749), Governor of the Habsburg Netherlands. Through his grandmother Johanna Christiane Rayski von Dubnitz (1767–1830), Ferdinand has descended from painters Lucas Cranach the Elder and Lucas Cranach the Younger.

== Biography ==
After private lessons at home, he was sent to study at the Schnepfenthal Salzmann School, where his father had been a student. After 1847, he attended the Maria-Magdalenen-Gymnasium in Breslau; graduating in 1851 with an Abitur. He first expressed his artistic ambitions during an extended trip to Italy with his father and his second wife Baroness Isabella von Pfister (1812-1896), but his father was insistent that he, as the eldest son, should succeed him as landlord.

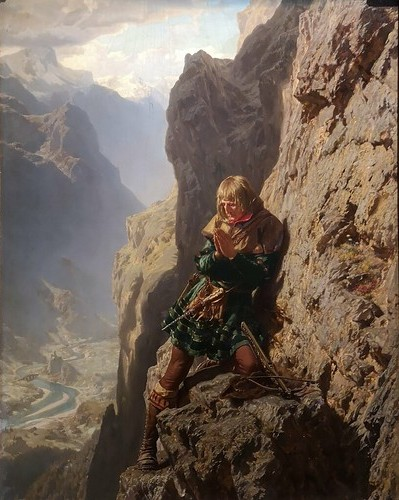
Emperor Maximilian I on the Martinswand

In pursuit of that goal, he studied the natural sciences and law at Humboldt University; as well as receiving practical training on his father's estates, while he continued to draw and paint in his free time. His father eventually relented, and agreed to seek the opinion of a third party; showing his works to Stanislaus von Kalckreuth, a Professor at the Kunstakademie Düsseldorf. When the Professor commented very favorably, he was allowed to enroll at the Kunstakademie where, at the age of twenty-six, he was much older than most of his fellow students. Kalckreuth became his mentor.

In 1859, Kalckreuth was offered the position of Director at the Grand-Ducal Saxon Art School, Weimar. He accepted the offer, and Harrach followed him. While a student there, he made several study trips; notably to the Alps and England. During the Austro-Prussian War, he was a reserve officer. In 1868, he married Countess Helene von Pourtalès (1849–1940), and settled in Berlin.

By this time, some of his paintings had been exhibited, in Dresden as well as Berlin. He also began receiving commissions from the nobility, for portraits. During the Franco-Prussian War, he was given the position of orderly officer on the staff of Crown Prince (later Kaiser) Frederick III, and was involved in drafting designs for the new Imperial German Coat-of-Arms.

In 1873, the death of his aunt Auguste, Princess of Liegnitz (second wife of King Frederick William III of Prussia), gave him the opportunity to acquire some land of his own. He bought Tiefhartmannsdorf Castle, which became his new family home. He and his wife, Countess Helene von Pourtales (1849-1940) had eight children altogether, but four died in childhood. Their son, Count Hans Albrecht von Harrach, became a well known sculptor.

In 1892, he was named a Professor at the Academy of Arts. The following year, he became a Senator on their governing board. In 1895, he was awarded a large gold medal at the Große Berliner Kunstausstellung. He was President of the Kunstausstellung in 1896. On his seventieth birthday, the occasion was noted with an article in the Vossische Zeitung. In 1912, on his eightieth birthday, he was honored by an exhibit devoted exclusively to his works. In her memoirs, Helene says that he painted "every day of his life".

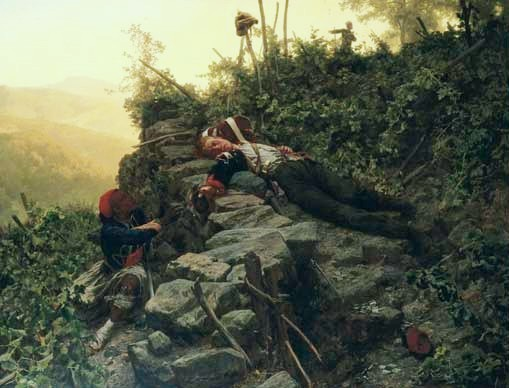
From the Vineyards of Wörth
