= Mathias Haydn =

Austrian wheelwright (1699–1763)

Mathias Haydn (31 January 1699 – 12 September 1763) was the father of two famous composers, Joseph and Michael Haydn. He worked as a wheelwright in the Austrian village of Rohrau, where he also served as Marktrichter, an office akin to village mayor.

== Life ==
Mathias (or Matthias) was born in Hainburg, a small town not far from Rohrau in the Archduchy of Austria, Holy Roman Empire of the German Nation. His ancestors were inhabitants of this town, which had a troubled history; notably his paternal grandparents were fatal civilian casualties in the Turkish occupation of the town in 1683. His father, Thomas Haydn, was also a wheelwright. The material prosperity of the family seems to have increased with each generation: the grandfather Kaspar (also a wheelwright) started out as a "Burgknecht", i.e. "a day laborer with a permanent domicile"; the father Thomas built himself a house and was formally a "citizen" of Hainburg; Mathias himself rose to the rank of Marktrichter in Rohrau and owned farmland as well as a house; and Mathias's son Joseph, the composer, eventually became owner of a very large house in Vienna and died with a large fortune.

In his youth, Mathias served an apprenticeship in Hainburg as a wheelwright and then in 1717 departed on the traditional travels of the journeyman. This period of his life lasted ten years, and took him among other places to Frankfurt am Main. He returned once to Hainburg (1722), a fact known because he applied there for a copy of his birth certificate.

On his final return in 1727 he became a master wheelwright and joined the guild of wheelwrights in Hainburg. However, he settled in nearby Rohrau, where he built a house for himself. The following year he married Maria Koller, aged 21, who had worked as an "under-cook" in the palace of Count Harrach, the aristocratic patron of Rohrau. The couple had twelve children, of whom six died in infancy. The six children who lived to adulthood were as follows (baptismal names not used in later life are parenthesized).

- (Anna Maria) Franziska Haydn (bap. 19 September 1730 – 29 July 1781)
- (Franz) Joseph Haydn (born 31 March 1732, died 31 May 1809)
- (Johann) Michael Haydn (bap. 14 September 1737 – 19 August 1806)
- Anna Maria Haydn (bap. 6 March 1739 – 27 August 1802)
- Anna Katherina Haydn (bap. 6 March 1739 – ?before 1801)
- Johann Evangelist Haydn (bap. 23 December 1743 – 10 May 1805)

Maria Koller Haydn died on 22 February 1754, aged 47. The following year Mathias remarried, to "his servant girl of nineteen", whose maiden name was Maria Anna Seeder. The second marriage produced five children, none of whom survived to adulthood.

Mathias lived on to 1763. This was long enough to see both of his composer sons reach professional success: Michael was a Kapellmeister at Großwardein, and Joseph had become Vice-Kapellmeister (in fact, Kapellmeister in all but name) for the fabulously wealthy Esterházy family in Eisenstadt. Haydn biographer Georg August Griesinger wrote (1810):

Haydn's father thus had the pleasure of seeing his son in the uniform of [the Esterházy] family, blue, trimmed with gold, and of hearing from the Prince many eulogies of the talent of his son.

Griesinger goes on to relate how Mathias died:

A short time after this visit, a wood pile fell on Meister Mathias while he was at work. He suffered broken ribs and died soon hereafter.

== Mathias and music ==
Mathias apparently enjoyed music a great deal. Griesinger recorded what Joseph had told him in his elderly reminiscences:

The father had seen a bit of the world, as was customary in his trade, and during his stay in Frankfurt am Main he had learned to strum the harp. As a master craftsman in Rohrau he continued to practice this instrument for pleasure after work. Nature, moreover, had endowed him with a good tenor voice, and his wife ... used to sing to the harp. The melodies of these songs were so deeply stamped in Joseph Haydn's memory that he could still recall them in advanced old age.

Albert Christoph Dies, another biographer who interviewed Joseph Haydn in old age, tells a similar story, adding that, insofar as Mathias knew how, he instructed his children musically:

In his youth the father journeyed about, following the custom of his trade, and reached Frankfurt am Main, where he learned to play the harp a little and, because he liked to sing, to accompany himself on the harp as well as he could. Afterwards, when he was married, he kept the habit of singing a little to amuse himself. All the children had to join in his concerts, to learn the songs, and to develop their singing voice. When his father sang, Joseph at the age of five used to accompany him as children will by playing with a stick on a piece of wood that his childish powers of imagination transformed into a violin.

For further information, see Haydn and folk music.

== Launching his sons' careers ==
Mathias, with his wife Maria, was also responsible for launching his sons' careers as professional musicians. The crucial events (in the case of Joseph) are narrated, rather differently, by Griesinger and Dies. Here is Griesinger's account:

One day the headmaster from the neighboring town of Hainburg, a distant relative of the Haydn family, came to Rohrau. Meister Mathias and his wife gave their usual little concert, and five-year-old Joseph sat near his parents and sawed at his left arm with a stick, as if he were accompanying on the violin. It astonished the schoolteacher that the boy observed time so correctly. He inferred from this a natural talent for music and advised the parents to send their Sepperl ... to Hainburg so that he might be set to an art that in time would unfailingly open to him the prospect "of becoming a clergyman." The parents, ardent admirers of the clergy, joyfully seized this proposal, and in his sixth year Joseph went to the headmaster in Hainburg.

Hainburg is eleven kilometers (seven miles) from Rohrau. As Joseph moved three years later to Vienna to become a professional chorister under Georg Reutter, he was never to live with his parents again.

Biographer Dies tells the same story (presumably, also on the basis of what Joseph Haydn told him) as follows:

Doubtless we are consider his father's love of singing as the first occasion when Haydn's spirit, already in earliest youth, entered its proper sphere. How easily the father could have set him to his own trade or dedicated him to the cloth, the heart's desire of both father and mother. This did not come about, thanks not a little to his concerts among the neighbors, by which he had won for himself a reputation in the whole town and even with the schoolmaster. And thus when the talk was of singing, all were unanimous in praise of the cartwright's son and could not commend enough his fine voice.

Since his father and the schoolmaster were close friends, it was natural for the latter to be drawn into consultation over Josephs's artistic destiny. The deliberations lasted a long time. The father still could not forget the priesthood. Finally, however, came the moment to decide. The various opinions converged. It was resolved that Joseph should stay with music and sooner or later, somewhere or other, perhaps as Regens chori or even as Kapellmeister, earn an honorable living.

Joseph had passed the age of six when he had to leave his birthplace and travel to Hainburg, a small town not far off. He was recommended to the care of the Regens chori, who undertook to guide the young boy on the virtuoso's course.

As can be seen, the biographers differ on whether it was an unnamed local schoolmaster (Dies), or Franck himself (Griesinger) who advised Haydn's parents to send their son to Franck. They also differ in whether the parents sought musical training with the view that it would help their son become a Catholic priest (Griesinger), or whether they reluctantly decided to give up on their hopes for a clerical career for Joseph and let him pursue a musical one instead (Dies). In such cases of conflict Haydn biographers tend to trust Griesinger.

Dies further states that once Haydn's career in Vienna as a chorister had been ended (by puberty; i.e. the loss of his soprano voice), and Haydn faced the difficult task of trying to survive as a freelance musician in Vienna, his parents insisted that he train as a priest, but that Joseph ultimately prevailed.

The launching of Michael's career proceeded more straightforwardly, as Joseph's singing career paved the way for Michael's. According to Dies:

Reutter was so captivated by [Joseph]'s talents that he declared to the father that even if he had twelve sons, he would take care of them all. The father saw himself freed of a great burden by this offer, consented to it, and some five years after dedicated Joseph's brother Michael and still later Johann to the musical muse. Both were taken on as choirboys, and, to Joseph's unending joy, both brothers were turned over to him to be trained.

Unlike Joseph or Michael, Johann did not become a composer, but worked in the Esterházy household as a tenor; his support may have been paid by Joseph.

== Mathias's social standing ==
The standing in society of Mathias bears on the biographies of his composer sons, which sometimes portray the Haydn family as impoverished, or as peasants. Karl Geiringer writes:

Mathias lived in a Rohrau in a cottage built by himself, and from the outset was fairly prosperous. It has been the custom of Haydn biographers to stress the extreme poverty of his father, and judging from the appearance of the house in which the Haydns lived throughout their lives, this attitude seems to be justified. The little low-roofed, thatch-covered cottage is bound to fill us with pity, and we all feel like Beethoven, who on his deathbed, when shown a picture of the Haydn house, exclaimed, "Strange that so great a man should have been born in so poor a house!"

Geiringer goes on to refute the view of poverty, based on evidence from bills that Mathias submitted for his work to Count Harrach as well as Mathias's tax records. Apparently, Mathias had "his own wine cellar, his own farmland, and some cattle". In addition, a letter he wrote to Michael in the mid-1750s (when both Joseph and Michael were living in Vienna) indicates he could afford at least the occasional extravagance:

Jesus Christ be praised!

My very dearest Hanßmichl, I am herewith sending you a carriage from Rohrau which can bring you and perhaps a good friend back and forth, and the river will spend the night in the Landstraß at the Falcon or the Angel; you can talk to him and arrange that you and Joseph and perhaps Ehrrath, all three of you, can get on the road early on Saturday. Mistress Nänerl and Mistress Loßl and another young lady will also receive a carriage, but only very early because it's so pitch dark at night, so heartfelt greetings to all of you, and in God's name.

Mathias Haydn

== Mathias as Marktrichter ==
From 1741 to 1761, Mathias was Marktrichter (German; literally "market judge") of Rohrau. According to Geiringer, "the list of his duties [was] imposing ... He was responsible for the good conduct of the population and had to keep a sharp lookout for adultery or excessive gambling. He had to see that people went to church and did not break the Sunday rest. It was his job to allot among the inhabitants of Rohrau the labor required by the patron, Count Harrach, and he was responsible for keeping the local roads in good repair On Sundays at six in the morning he had to report on all such matters to the count's steward. Every two years an open-air meeting of the whole community took place at which the Marktrichter rendered a detailed account of the work done during the past period."

== Visits to Joseph in Vienna ==
Although Mathias sent both of his future-composer sons away from home when they were young, he certainly did not lose interest in them. This is attested, for instance, by the letter quoted above, and by two visits he made to Vienna that were remembered decades later by Joseph and related to biographers.

Of these, the more dramatic was one in which Mathias rescued Joseph from being turned into a castrato. Griesinger (1810) relates the tale thus:

At that time there were still many castrati employed at the court and in the churches in Vienna, and the director of the Choir School doubtless supposed he was making young Haydn's fortune when he came up with a plan to turn him into a soprano, and actually asked the father for permission. The father, whom this proposal utterly displeased, set off at once on the road for Vienna; and thinking that the operation might perhaps already have been undertaken, he entered the room where his son was with the question, "Sepperl, does anything hurt you? Can you still walk?" Delighted to find his son unharmed, he protested against all further unreasonable demands of this sort. ... The truth of this anecdote was vouched for by persons to whom [Joseph] Haydn has oftentimes told it.

A few years later, when Joseph as working as a freelance musician and living in very humble quarters, he suffered a burglary, and Mathias came to Vienna to help:

While he was living in the Seilerstadt, all his few possessions were stolen. Haydn wrote to his parents to see if they might send him some linen for a few shirts; his father came to Vienna, brought his son a seventeen-kreutzer piece and the advice "Fear God, and love thy neighbor!" By the generosity of good friends, Haydn soon had his loss restored.
