= Auguste von Harrach =

Wife of Prussian King

- Princess von Liegnitz; Countess von Hohenzollern
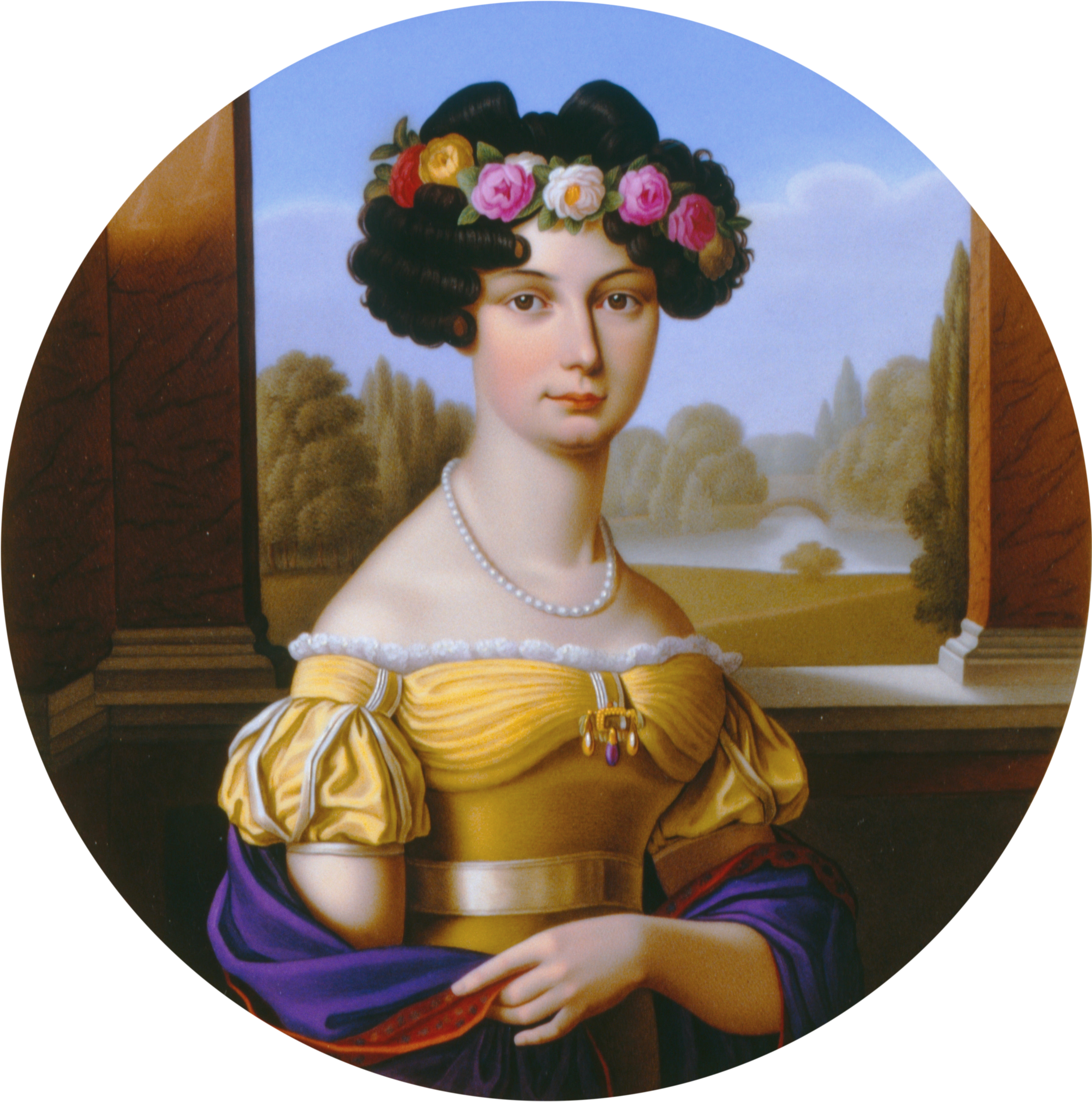
- Auguste Fürstin von Liegnitz after Wilhelm von Schadow
- Born: 30 August 1800
- Died: 5 June 1873 (aged 72)
- Noble family: Harrach-Rohrau-Thannhausen
- Spouse: Frederick William III of Prussia (m. 1824; died 1840)
- Father: Count Ferdinand Joseph von Harrach zu Rohrau und Thannhausen
- Mother: Johanna Christiane von Rayski

Countess Auguste von Harrach zu Rohrau und Thannhausen, Princess of Liegnitz (30 August 1800 – 5 June 1873), was the second wife of King Frederick William III of Prussia. At the time of their marriage, the House of Harrach was still not recognized as equal for dynastic purposes. Later, in 1841, a year after Frederick William's death, they were officially recognized as a mediatized family (a family that once ruled a territory with Imperial immediacy within the Holy Roman Empire), with the style of Illustrious Highness, which allowed them to officially have equal status for marriage purposes to those reigning and royal families. Thus, in 1824, when the marriage occurred, it was treated as morganatic, so she was not named Queen, but was given the title Princess von Liegnitz and Countess von Hohenzollern. Frederick reportedly stated that he did not wish to have another queen after Queen Louise.

== Biography ==
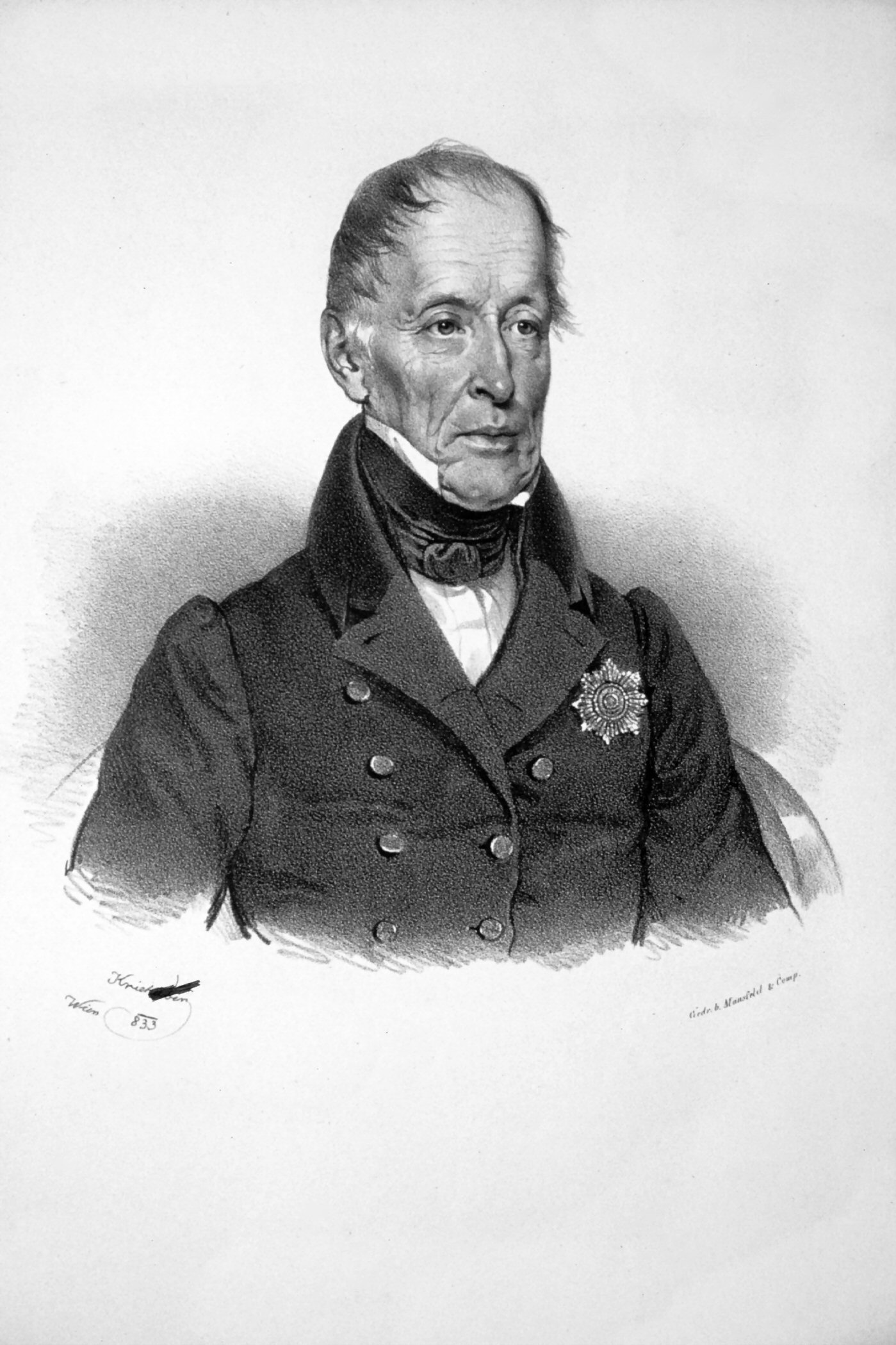
Litograph of Auguste's father: Count Ferdinand Joseph von Harrach (1763-1841)

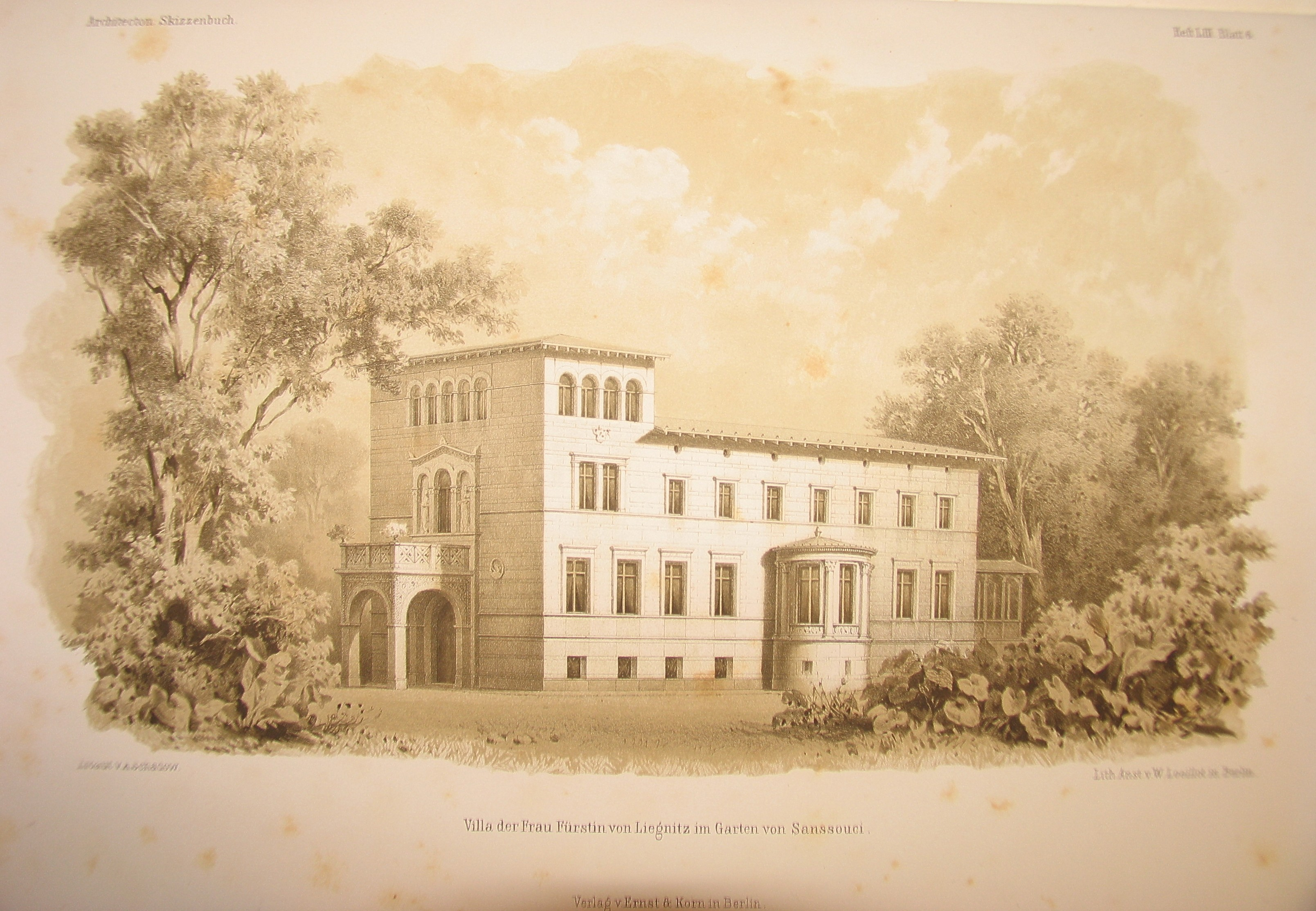
Augusta's residence, Villa Liegnitz, Potsdam

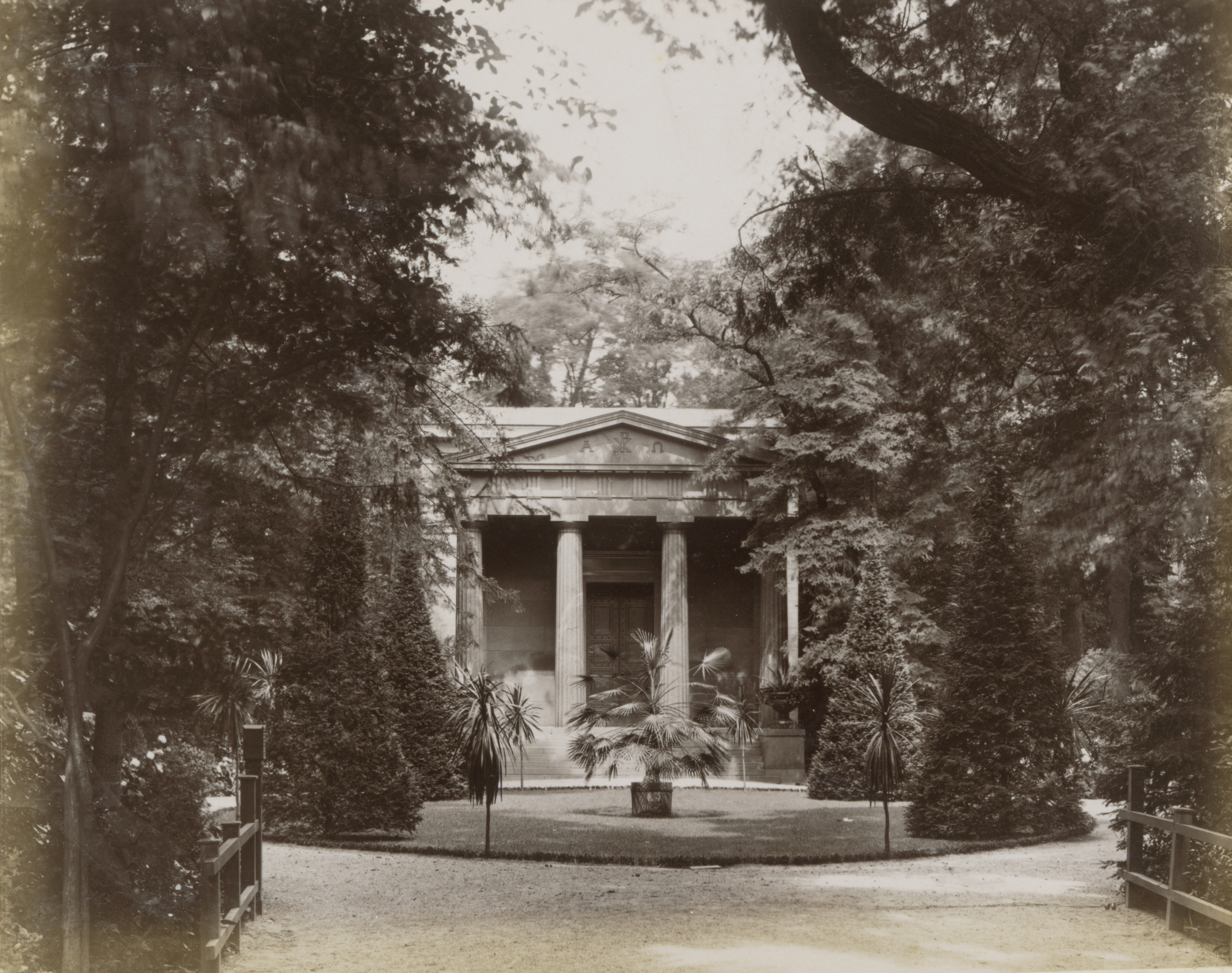
Mausoleum, Schlosspark Charlottenburg

=== Early life and ancestry ===
Auguste was the daughter of Austrian Count Ferdinand Joseph von Harrach zu Rohrau und Thannhausen (1763-1841) and Saxon noblewoman Johanna Christiane von Rayski (1767-1830), whose father, Adolf Heinrich von Rayski (1726-1778) was the owner of Schloss Kleinstruppen, near Dresden.

Her father belonged to Upper Silesian, cadet branch of the House of Harrach, which became the main line in 1886, only upon the death of Count Anton Leonhard XI von Harrach zu Rohrau und Thannhausen (1815-1886), head of the most senior, Austrian line of the family. Agnatically, Auguste descended from Aloys Thomas Raimund, Count von Harrach, who served as Viceroy of Naples, and his son, Count Friedrich August von Harrach, who served as the Governor of the Habsburg Netherlands.

Through her mother, she descended from the Saxon and Bohemian nobility, including her grandmother Christiane Sophie von Leyser, who was a direct matrilineal descendant of Lucas Cranach the Elder and Lucas Cranach the Younger.

=== Marriage ===
Auguste met King Frederick William III at a spa in Teplitz in Bohemia in 1822. They married at Charlottenburg Palace on 9 November 1824. As Auguste was a Catholic and considered a non-dynast at the time, the marriage was initially kept a secret. In many quarters the marriage was greeted with great surprise and some initially refused to believe it. The greatest opponents of this marriage were the Mecklenburg-Strelitz cousins, the family of the King's first wife, Queen Louise. Auguste converted to Protestantism in 1826.

=== Widowhood and death ===
As a morganatic spouse, Auguste was ignored in the protocol of the court life of Berlin, ranking after all the princes and princesses of the royal family. She was not politically active and had no children. Auguste nursed Frederick while he was dying in 1840, and it was decided to allow her to attend his burial in the crypt of the mausoleum in Schlosspark Charlottenburg, Berlin.

After his death, Auguste was given a large allowance and allowed to continue to live at the royal estate in Sanssouci Park, Potsdam. During her widowhood, she established her household in Villa Liegnitz, near Neues Palais, which was, after her death, given to her husband's great-granddaughter, Princess Charlotte of Prussia. In her later years, Auguste traveled a lot, often visiting Italy, Switzerland, Great Britain and France. She was godmother to her nephew, Count Ferdinand von Harrach, a painter from the younger, Upper Silesian branch of the Harrach family. As one of Auguste's designated heirs, the inheritance from his aunt gave him the opportunity to acquire Tiefhartmannsdorf castle (Lower Silesia) in 1874, previously owned by the von Zedlitz noble family.

On 5 June 1873, Auguste died while on a spa stay in Bad Homburg, Hochtaunuskreis, Hesse, Germany. She was buried alongside her husband and his first wife in the crypt of the mausoleum in Schlosspark Charlottenburg, Berlin.

== Sources ==
- Wichard Graf Harrach: Auguste Fürstin von Liegnitz. Ihre Jahre an d. Seite König Friedrich Wilhelms III. von Preussen (1824–1840) Stapp, Berlin 1987, ISBN 3-87776-190-9.
- Gisela und Paul Habermann: Fürstin von Liegnitz. Ein Leben im Schatten der Königin Luise Nicolaische, Berlin 1988 ISBN 3875842294
