= Domenico Martinelli =

Italian architect (1650–1718)

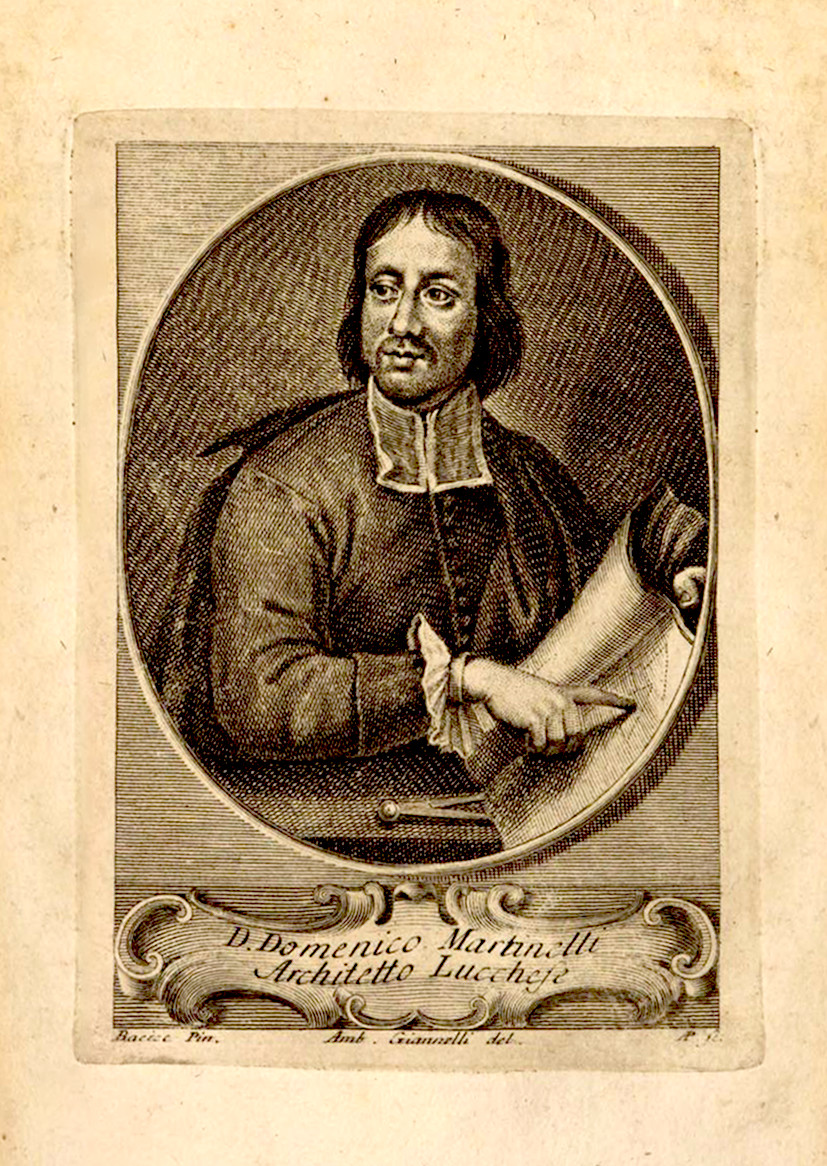
Domenico Martinelli

Domenico Martinelli (November 30, 1650 – September 11, 1718) was an Italian architect who worked for Carlo Fontana during 1678. He was an evident figure in the shaping of Baroque style in the North Alps. In 2010, a musical tribute called "Project Martinelli" was performed to him in Munich.

== Biography ==
He was born in Lucca, Tuscany, and ordained a priest in his hometown. He studied at the Accademia di San Luca in Rome, where he taught architecture and prospective. In his time he traveled much of Europe, spanning from within Italy, to Austria, Bohemia, Moravia, Poland and the Netherlands. Not as well known as his contemporaries, he often worked with Johann Bernhard Fischer von Erlach and Johann Lukas von Hildebrandt.

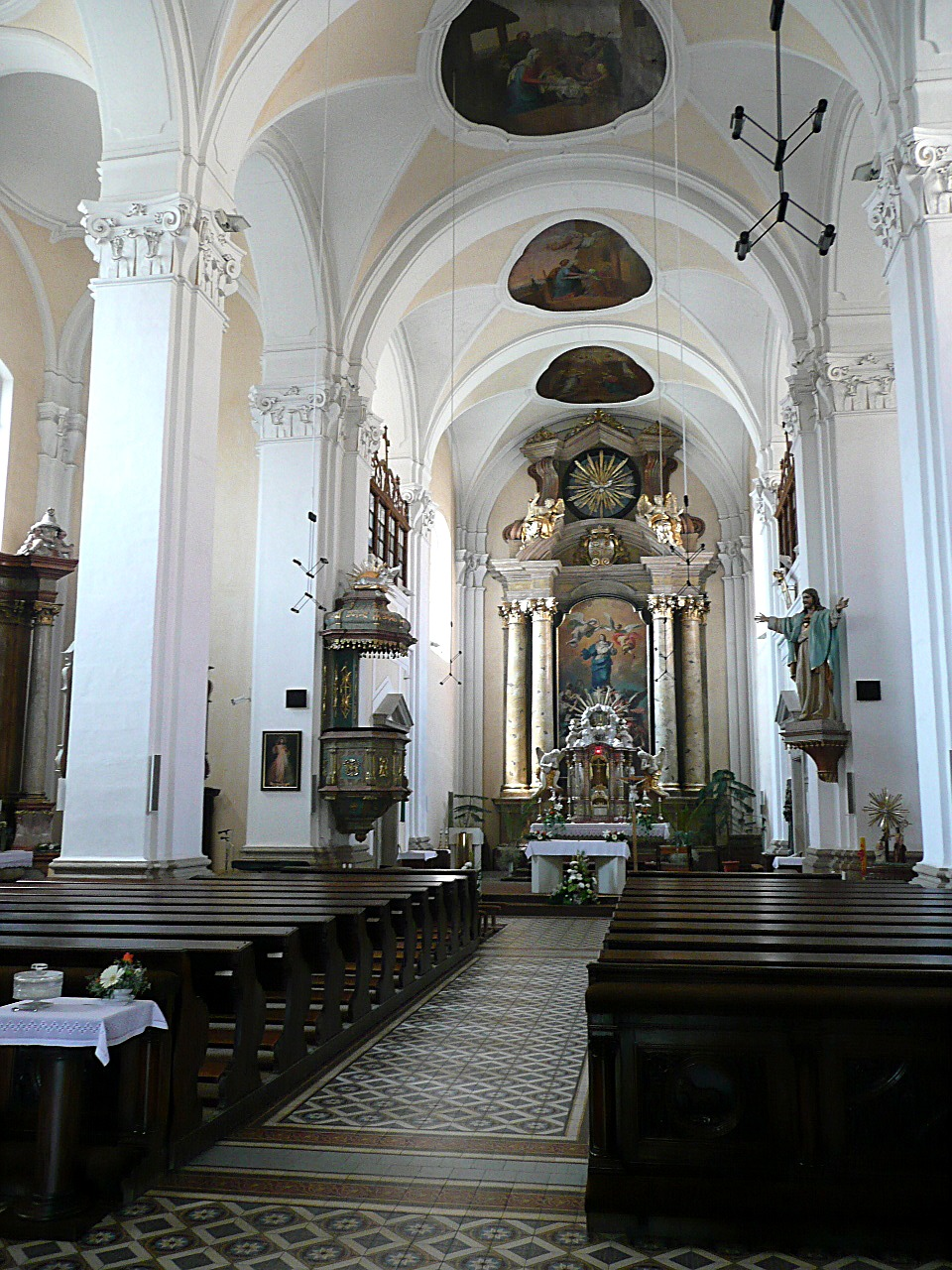
Interior of The Church of the Virgin Mary in Uherský Brod, now in the Czech Republic. Architect: Domenico Martinelli.

His influence on the Baroque style was notable in his work Stadtpalais Liechtenstein (Town Palace), in Vienna (1692–1705), which glorifies an elaborate staircase, derived from Bernini's Chigi-Odescalchi Palace, in Rome. He designed the Palais Harrach, Gartenpalais (Garden Palace), and the Kaunitz Palace, in Slavkov (Austerlitz). He introduced the cour d'honneur in the latter. In his later years after teaching at San Luca Academy, he struggled with illness and returned to his home town of Lucca where he died.

== Works ==
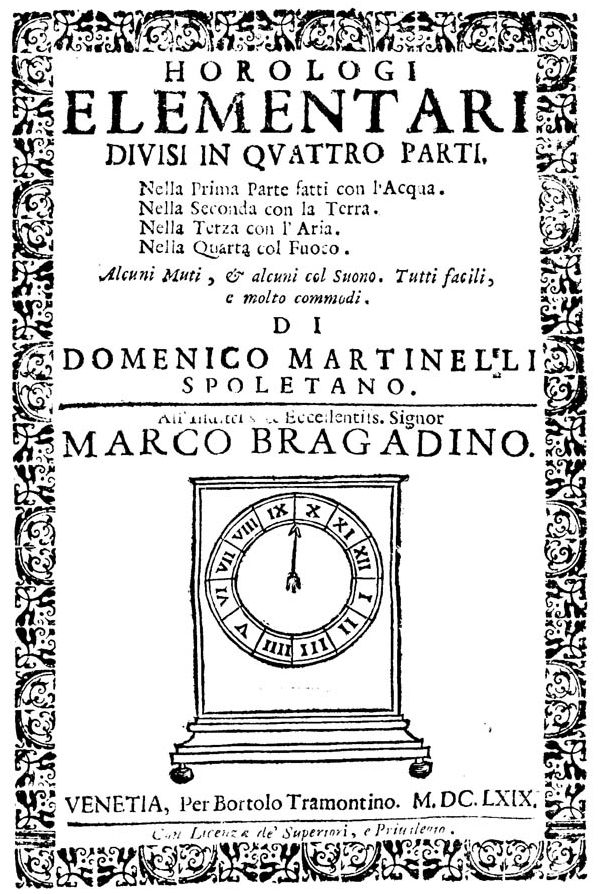
Horologi elementari divisi in quattro parti, 1669

- Horologi elementari divisi in quattro parti (in Italian). Venezia: Bartolomeo Tramontino. 1669.

== See also ==
- Johann Bernhard Fischer von Erlach
- Johann Lukas von Hildebrandt
