= Johann Evangelist Haydn =

Classical tenor singer

Johann Evangelist Haydn (December 23, 1743 – May 10, 1805) was a tenor of the classical era; the younger brother of the composers Joseph Haydn and Michael Haydn. He was often called "Hansl", a diminutive form of "Johann".

Johann was the eleventh child of Mathias Haydn and Anna Maria Koller Haydn (Joseph was second, and Michael sixth). His career training may have been mixed. According to Albert Christoph Dies, an early biographer of Joseph Haydn, Johann followed his older brothers in serving as a choirboy in St. Stephen's Cathedral in Vienna. However, Rosemary Hughes indicates that Johann was also trained in the profession of his father Mathias, namely that of wheelwright.

Hughes describes Johann as "delicate and quite incapable of carrying on his father's business." In 1763, Johann's father died, leaving a will that specified an early financial distribution to Johann, prior to the formal division of the estate; as Jones suggests, this indicates that he was not yet able to support himself. In 1765, after his stepmother had remarried, Johann left home and joined his brother Joseph, who by this time was employed in Eisenstadt as Kapellmeister to the Esterházy family. Joseph took his younger brother into his home and found him a position as a tenor in the Esterházys' church choir. Johann worked without pay, supported by his brother, for six years, after which he drew a small salary, which Joseph supplemented.

Johann was apparently not a very accomplished singer. The composer Antonio Salieri once remarked of a pupil that he "sang through the nose like Hansl Haydn". Perhaps as a result, his services to the Esterházy family were limited to church music; he was not recruited to perform in any of the many operas directed by Joseph starting in the 1770s. Johann did some teaching and may have been pressed into service from time to time as an emergency music copyist.

It is possible that Johann was paid as a singer as a favor to Joseph; that Haydn's employer at the time (Prince Nikolaus Esterházy) esteemed Haydn's services enough to make such arrangements is suggested by a similar act later on, in which he kept on the payroll another mediocre singer, Haydn's mistress Luigia Polzelli.

Johann briefly lost his job in 1775 when some "minor infraction" (Robbins Landon) brought upon him the wrath of Prince Nikolaus's estates director, the short-tempered Peter Ludwig von Rahier. The position was restored at Joseph Haydn's intervention. Johann was again unemployed from 1790 (when Prince Anton Esterházy succeeded Nikolaus and abolished most of the family's musical establishment) until 1795 (when Anton's successor Nikolaus II revived it). Nothing is known about what Johann did during this time. Following his reinstatement, he continued in the service of the Esterházy family for the remainder of his life, dying in Eisenstadt at the age of 63.
