= Stattegg =

- Municipality
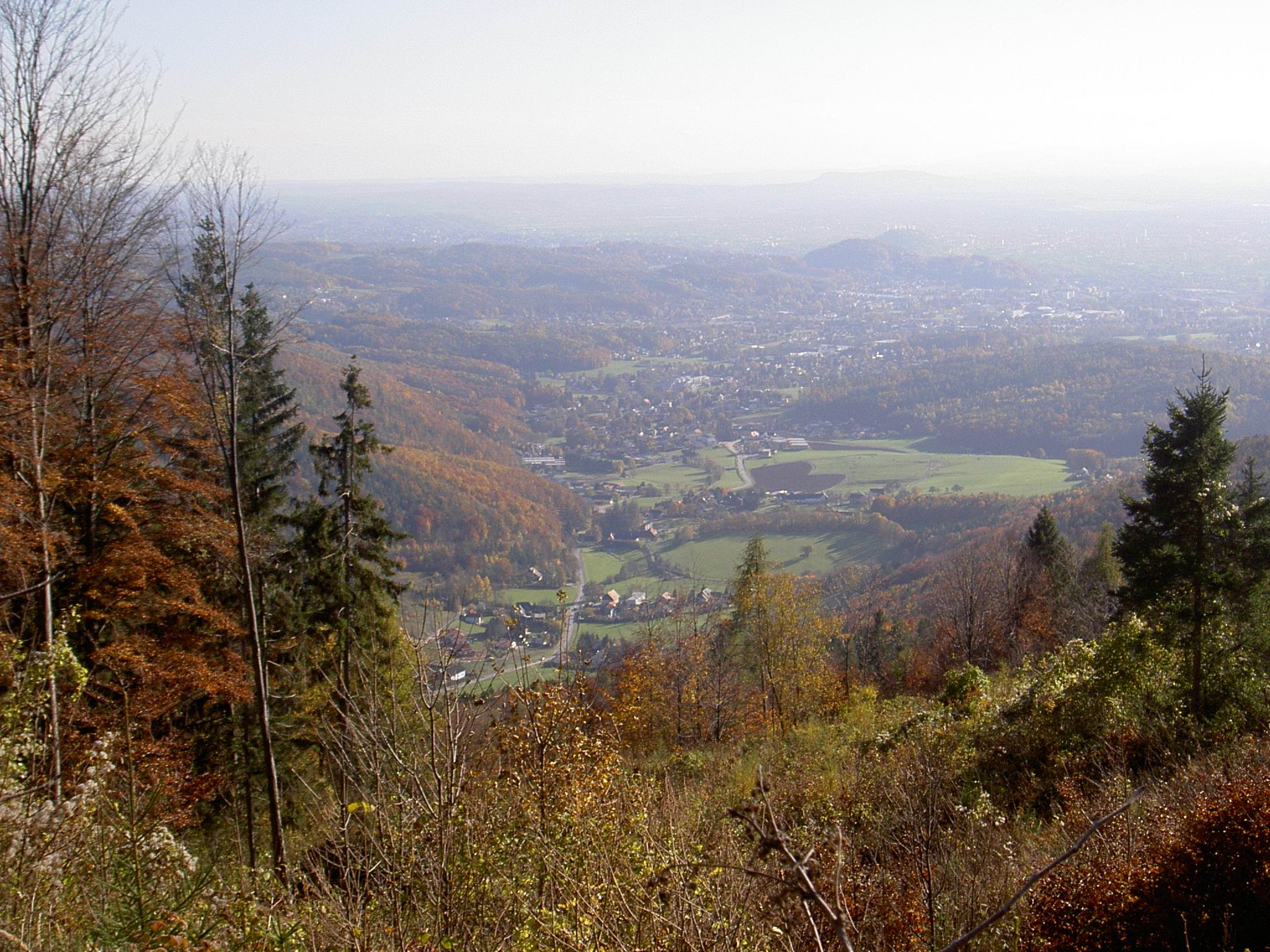

- Coat of arms

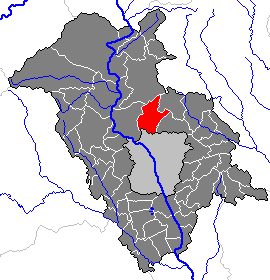
- Location within Graz-Umgebung district

- Location within Austria
- Coordinates: 47°08′14″N 15°25′12″E
- Country: Austria
- State: Styria
- District: Graz-Umgebung

Government
  - Mayor: Andreas Kahr-Walzl (ÖVP)

Area
  - Total: 25.85 km^{2} (9.98 sq mi)
- Elevation: 432 m (1,417 ft)

Population (2018-01-01)
  - Total: 2,927
  - Density: 113.2/km^{2} (293.3/sq mi)
- Time zone: UTC+1 (CET)
  - Summer (DST): UTC+2 (CEST)
- Postal code: 8046
- Area code: 0316
- Vehicle registration: GU
- Website: www.stattegg. steiermark.at

Stattegg is a village and a suburb of Graz, the capital of the Austrian state of Styria. It lies at the bottom of the Schoeckl, a mountain of the European Alps. Stattegg has 2982 inhabitants (as of 1 January 2021) and consists of 13 Katastralgemeinden: Buch, Eichberg, Hochgreit, Hohenberg, Hub, Kalkleiten, Krail, Leber, Mühl, Neudorf, Rannach, Steingraben, Ursprung.

== History ==
In medieval times the Stadecker were a dynasty of ministeriales in the service of the sovereign of Styria. Their seat was the castle of Stadeck located in Hub, a part of Stattegg. Ulrich I von Stadeck was 26th arch bishop of Salzburg (1256–1265), Rudolf von Stadegge was a minstrel, several were Landeshauptmann of Styria. 1400 the dynasty ended with Hans and Leuthold of Stadeck. Since 1951, the castle hill has been used by the Stattegg Volunteer Fire Fighters as a training ground.

== Objects of Interest ==
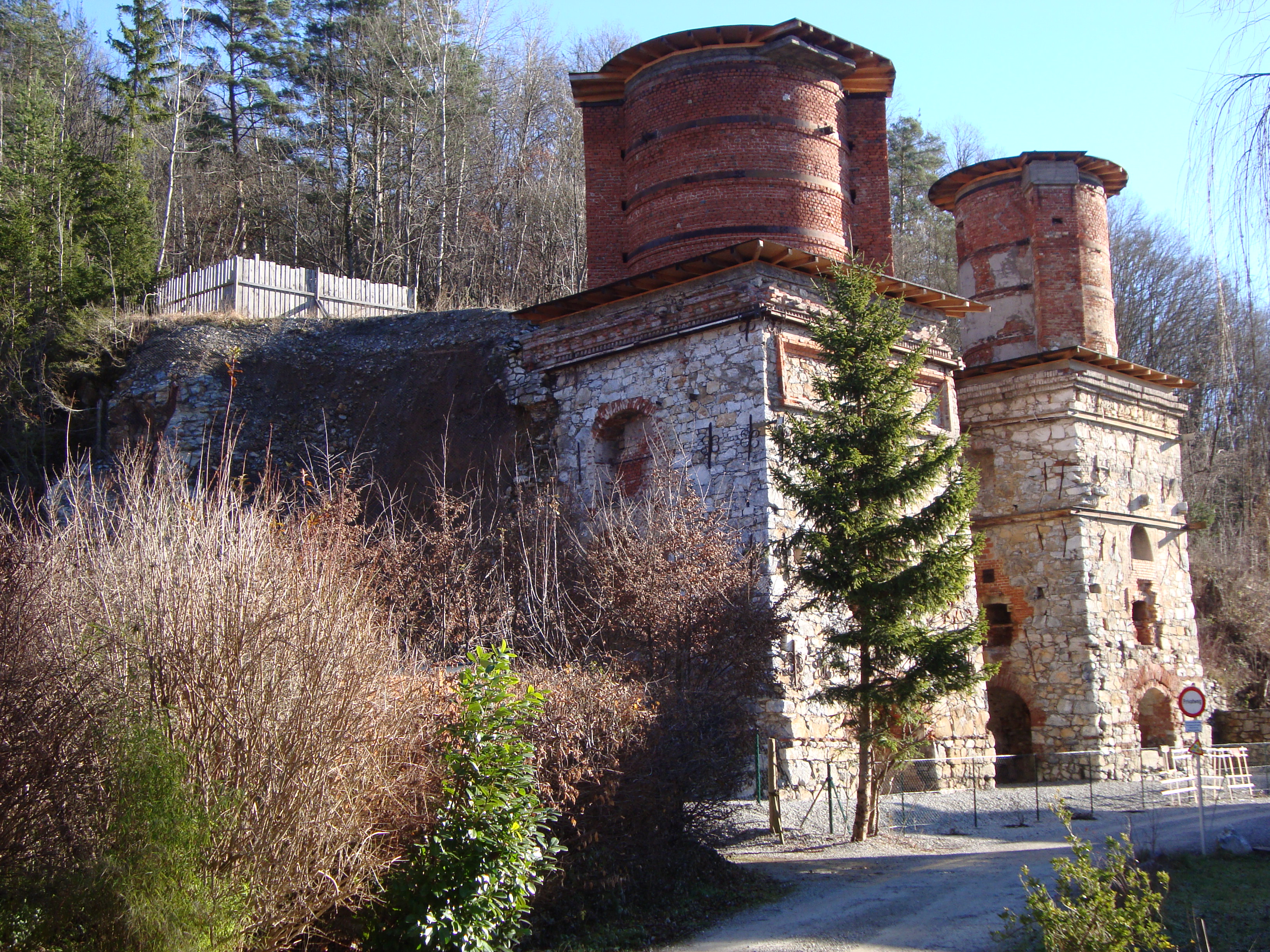
old limekiln

- Church Maria Schutz in Kalkleiten
- Old lime kiln (founded 1890, stopped 1966, classified as a historical monument since 1981)
- Well of Andritz-Ursprung (Jakob-Lorber Begegnungsstätte)

== Citizens of honor ==
=== Citizens of honor ===
- 1952 Josef Krainer (1903–1971), Landeshauptmann
- 1952 Ulrich Lässer, Gemeinderat
- 1954 Heribert Ringer, Bürgermeister 1951–1965
- 1965 Alexander Mayer
- 1978 Friedrich Niederl (1920–2012), Landeshauptmann
- 1978 Eduard Matzenauer, Bürgermeister 1965–1988
- 1984 Josef Krainer Jr. (1930–2016), Landeshauptmann
- 2006 Helmut Möstl, Bürgermeister 1988–2006

=== Relevant people, related to Stattegg ===
- Franz Feiertag (* 5. Dezember 1955 in Graz), European Champion in TREC 2010
- Florian Kainz (* 24. Oktober 1992), Austrian soccer player
