= Rohrau, Austria =

Rohrau Rohrau
- Municipality
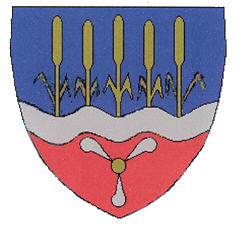
- Coat of arms

- Location within Lower Austria Location within Austria
- Coordinates: 48°4′0″N 16°51′30″E
- Country: Austria
- State: Lower Austria
- District: Bruck an der Leitha

Government
  - Mayor: Herbert Speckl (ÖVP)

Area
  - Total: 20.51 km^{2} (7.92 sq mi)
- Elevation: 148 m (486 ft)

Population (2018-01-01)
  - Total: 1,609
  - Density: 78.45/km^{2} (203.2/sq mi)
- Time zone: UTC+1 (CET)
  - Summer (DST): UTC+2 (CEST)
- Postal code: 2471
- Area code: 02164
- Vehicle registration: BL
- Website: Official website

Rohrau (German: Marktgemeinde Rohrau) is a village in the state of Lower Austria. The name comes from two German words: Rohr (reed) and Au (riparian forest). South of the village is a riparian forest and a swamp covered with reed.

Rohrau is located in the "industrial quarter" (Industrieviertel) of Lower Austria. Its area is 20.50 km^{2}, of which 8.38% is forested. There is a kindergarten and a primary school (Volksschule). It is the birthplace of the composer Joseph Haydn who was born there on 31 March 1732.

== Subdivisions ==
Rohrau is subdivided into the following Katastralgemeinden:

- Rohrau
- Gerhaus
- Hollern
- Pachfurth

== History ==
The area in pre-Roman times belonged to the Celtic kingdom of Noricum. In Roman Times, the area was part of the Roman province of Pannonia Superior; Rohrau is near to Carnuntum, a former Roman army camp close to the village of Petronell-Carnuntum. Rohrau grew along an old road next to the river Leitha connecting Carnuntum to the bridge crossing the river at Bruck an der Leitha, the current district capital.

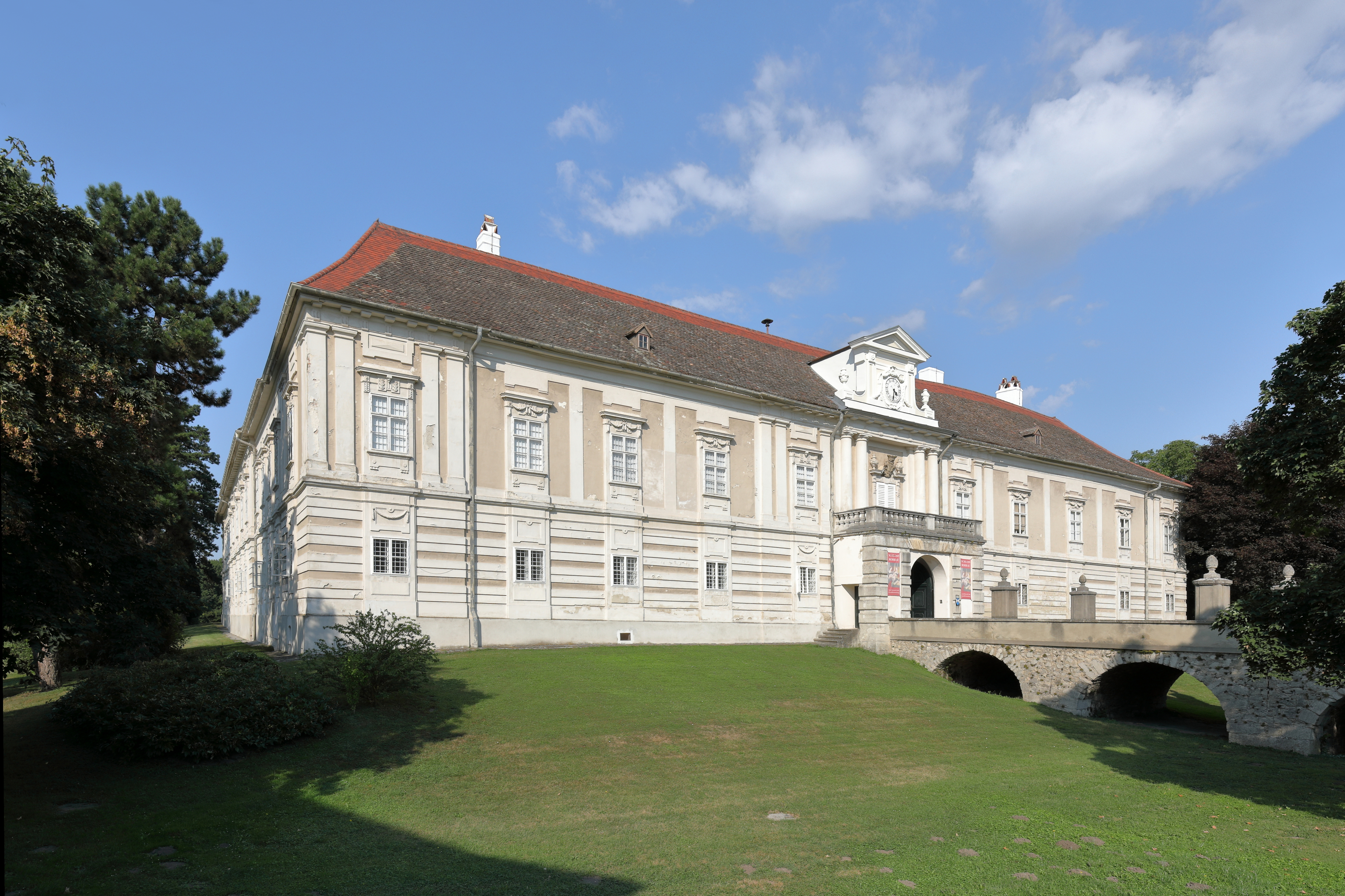
Schloss Rohrau

In the Middle Ages, a castle was built, surrounded by a moat; later it was converted to a chateau. Its facade as seen today is in the "Josephinian Style", a late and very rare Baroque style that only was used during the reign of Emperor Joseph II in the late 18th century. The chateau (Schloss Rohrau) has been owned by the Counts of Harrach and their descendants since 1524, and it contains the largest private collection of Dutch oil paintings in Austria.

In the 16th century, Rohrau was given the right to hold a market, thus becoming a Market town.

In the early 18th century, the town was plagued by attacks from the Kuruczes, described by Geiringer as "the peasant army of the anti-Habsburg Hungarian party". In 1704, they plundered the town and burned homes, returning to do the same in 1706; a further attack took place in 1707. A resident who lost his house to the flames in both 1704 and 1706 was Lorenz Koller (born 1675), who was the Marktrichter (roughly, mayor) of the town and the maternal grandfather of Joseph Haydn (see below).

In the summer of 1802, Queen Maria Carolina of Naples and her daughters visited Rohrau. Maria Carolina's daughter, Princess Maria Amalia of Naples and Sicily, wrote in her journal on 18th June: "We went to visit Count Harrach; we strolled through his garden, which is the most beautiful I have ever seen."

=== Rohrau as former border town ===
Rohrau stands in close proximity to the neighbouring state of Burgenland, which was part of Hungary until 1921. Rohrau once had a border checkpoint at the bridge crossing the river to what was then the Hungarian part of the Austrian Empire. This checkpoint, which now is a farmhouse, was only an internal border crossing, and the local noble family Harrach, in fact, owned land on both sides.

=== Rohrau and Haydn ===
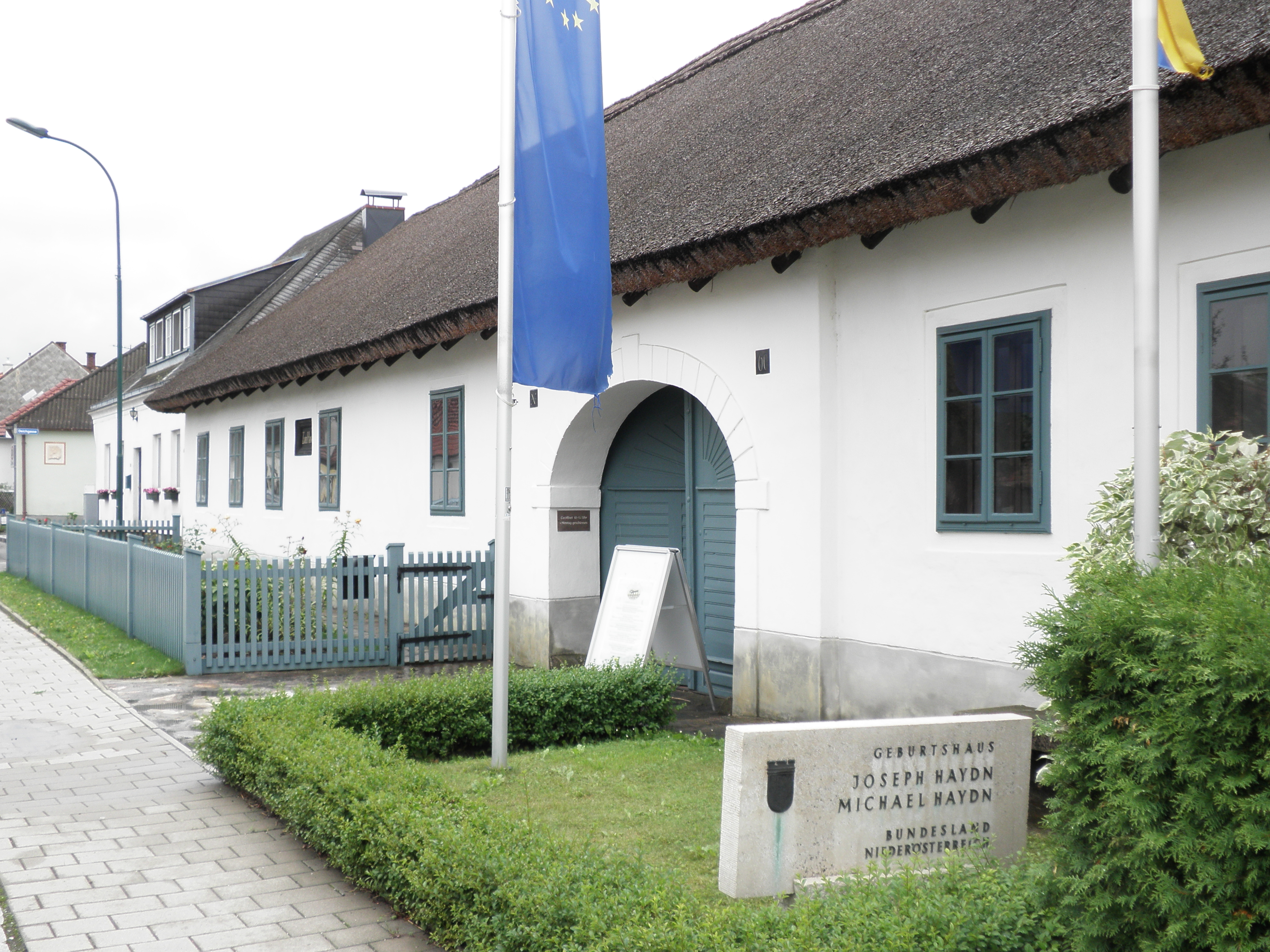
Haydn's birth home in Rohrau, now a museum

The composer Joseph Haydn was born in Rohrau in 1732. His father Mathias was a master wheelwright who served as Marktrichter of the village; something akin to mayor. His mother had previously worked as a cook in the Harrach household. Haydn lived in Rohrau only until about 1738, when he was sent away to attend a boarding school in nearby Hainburg.

The composer's birth home, which is also the birth home of his brother Michael Haydn, is today a museum; it only partially reflects its original form since it has been repeatedly restored following fires and floods. It has also been expanded to serve its purpose as a museum.

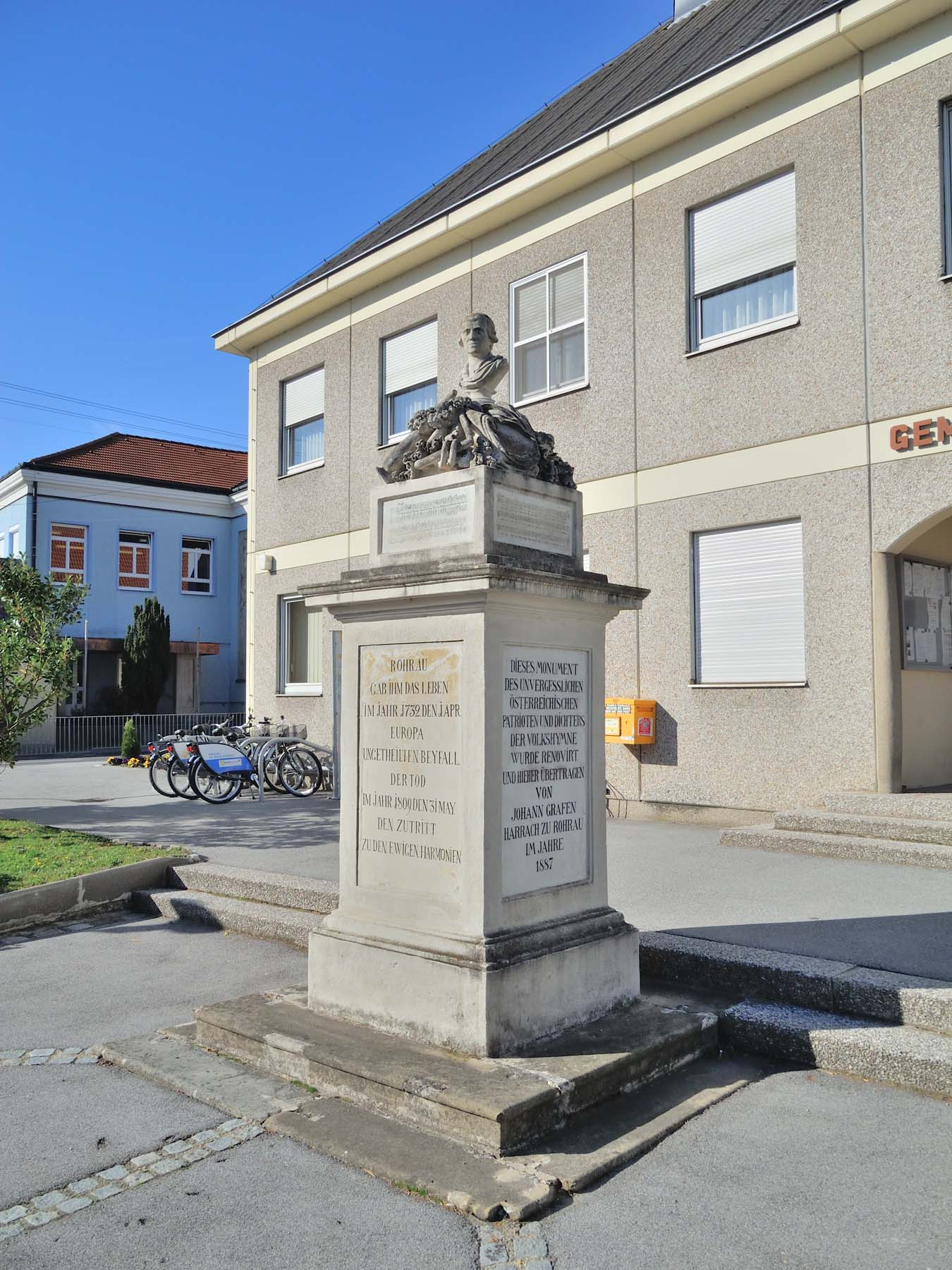
The Haydn monument in the center of Rohrau

A monument to Haydn was erected by Count Karl Leonhard Harrach in 1793, during the composer's own lifetime; it is thus the oldest of all Haydn monuments. It was originally placed in the park of Harrach chateau, on an artificial island (the "Haydn-Insel") in the Leitha River, created for the purpose. The monument was later transferred to the center of the village, where it stands today. When Haydn returned from London in 1795, he visited the monument during an emotional return to his home town.

=== Historical population of Rohrau ===
- 1971: 1,341
- 1981: 1,258
- 1991: 1,224
- 2001: 1,455
- 2011: 1,544
- 2014: 1,569

== Economy ==
As of 2011, there were 47 companies related to agricultural and forestry, and 89 non-agricultural jobs. 791 persons were employed at their place of residence. 43 people were unemployed.

Local agricultural products: sugar beets, wheat, maize/corn, potatoes, sheep, wine.

== Local politics ==
The village mayor (Bürgermeister), is Herbert Speckl, Deputy Mayor is Albert Mayer. The "village secretary" (Gemeindesekratär) is Josef Rössler. In 2015 election the seats at the village council, 19 in total, were distributed between the People's Party - ÖVP (14) and the Social Democratic Party - SPÖ (5). Traditionally the People's Party has a stronghold in Lower Austria, due to the support they get from farmers and white-collar employees.

== Church ==
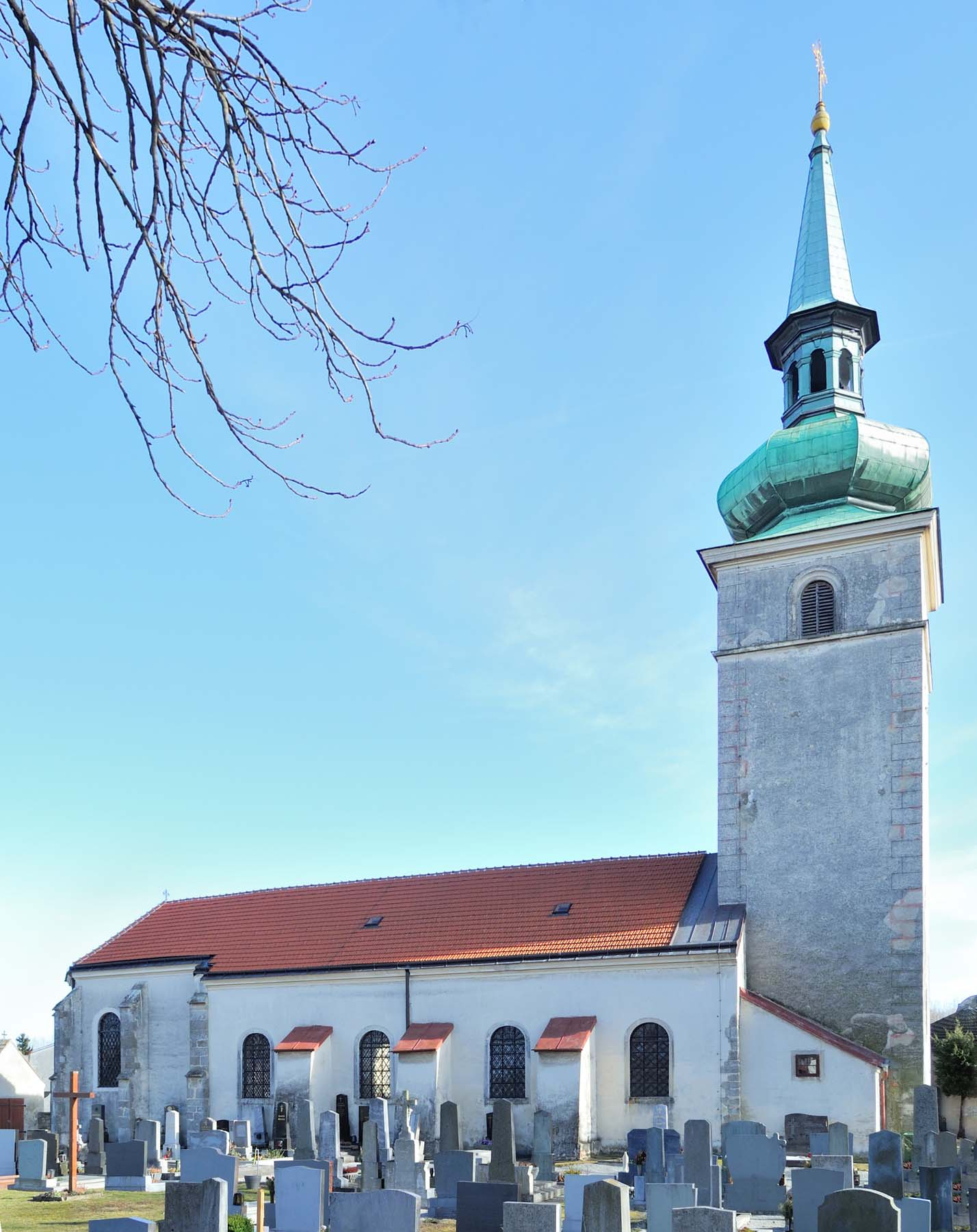
Church of St. Vitus, Rohrau

Rohrau is part of the Roman Catholic Archdiocese of Vienna. The Catholic priest at the church of St. Vitus is Dr. Norbert Mendecki.

== Sights ==
- Schloß Museum Rohrau - art collection of the Counts of Harrach
- Haydn-Geburtshaus Museum (birthplace of Joseph and Michael Haydn)
- Pfarrkirche St. Vitus (St. Vitus church) containing the "Haydn-Orgel" a historic church organ, also the Baroque grave of Haydn's parents situated in the churchyard, and the chapel in front of the church
- The Joseph Haydn Monument in front of the city hall

== Famous persons ==
- (Franz) Joseph Haydn (1732–1809), composer
- (Johann) Michael Haydn (1737–1806), composer and brother of Joseph Haydn
- Karl von Harrach (1570–1628), consultant to Emperor Ferdinand II
- Johann Herbsthofer (1866–1932), Austrian politician
- Andrew Molles (1907 – 6 Jan. 1975), American painter (Informel), settled in Rohrau, and died there.
