= Palais Harrach =

Coordinates: 48°12′41″N 16°21′52″E

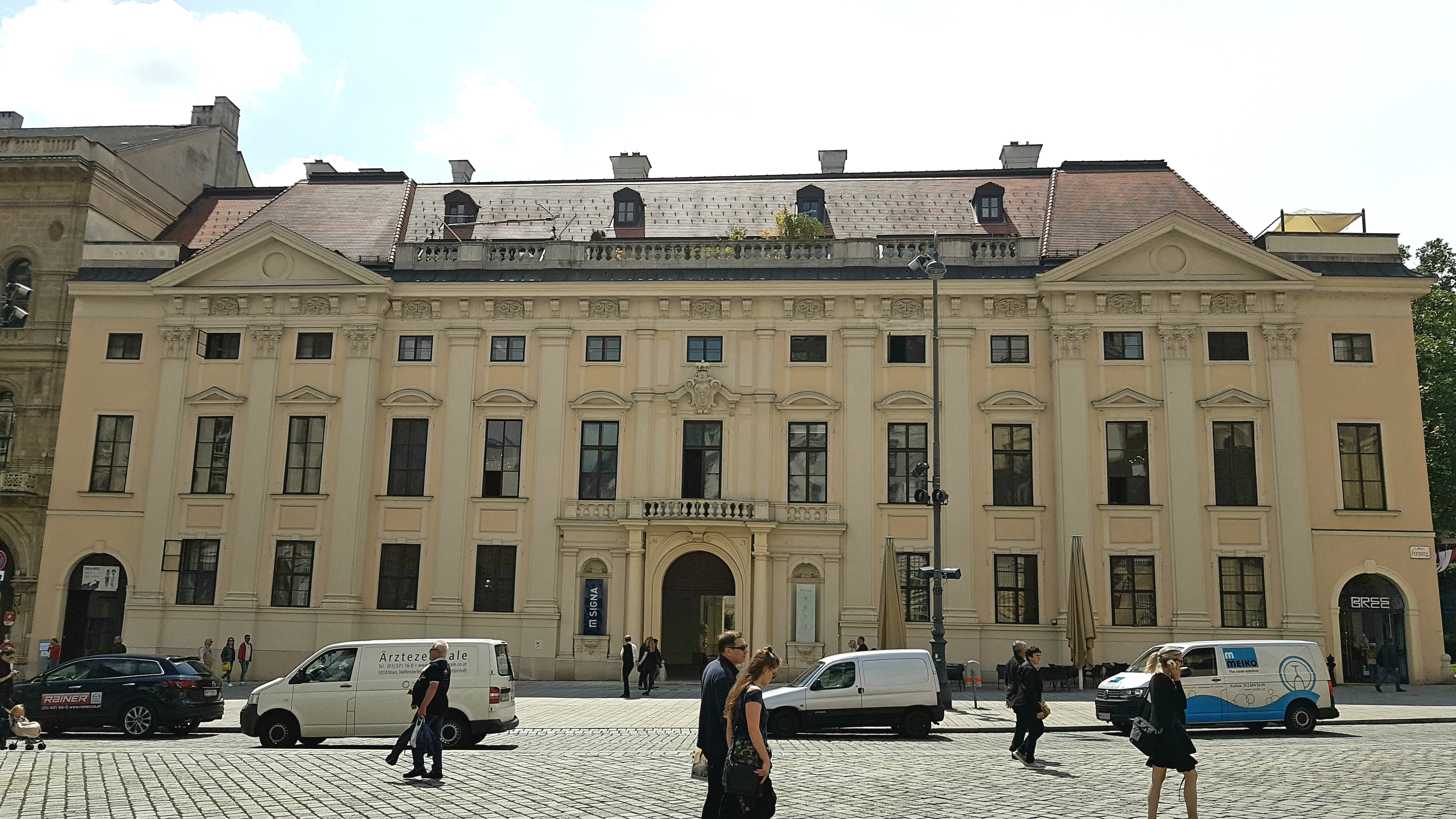
Palais Harrach in 2018

Palais Harrach is a Baroque-style palace located at Freyung 3 in Vienna, Austria. It was originally owned by the noble Harrach family. The building was extensively restored and renovated in the late 1990s, and it now houses offices and shops.

Count Ferdinand Bonaventura I von Harrach bought a ruined edifice on this site during the late 17th century, which was replaced in 1696–98 by a new building designed by Domenico Martinelli. From 1870 to 1970, it housed the picture collection of Count Aloys Thomas Raimund von Harrach, which is now in Schloss Rohrau. The palace was sold to the municipality of Vienna in 1975.
