= Stadeck =

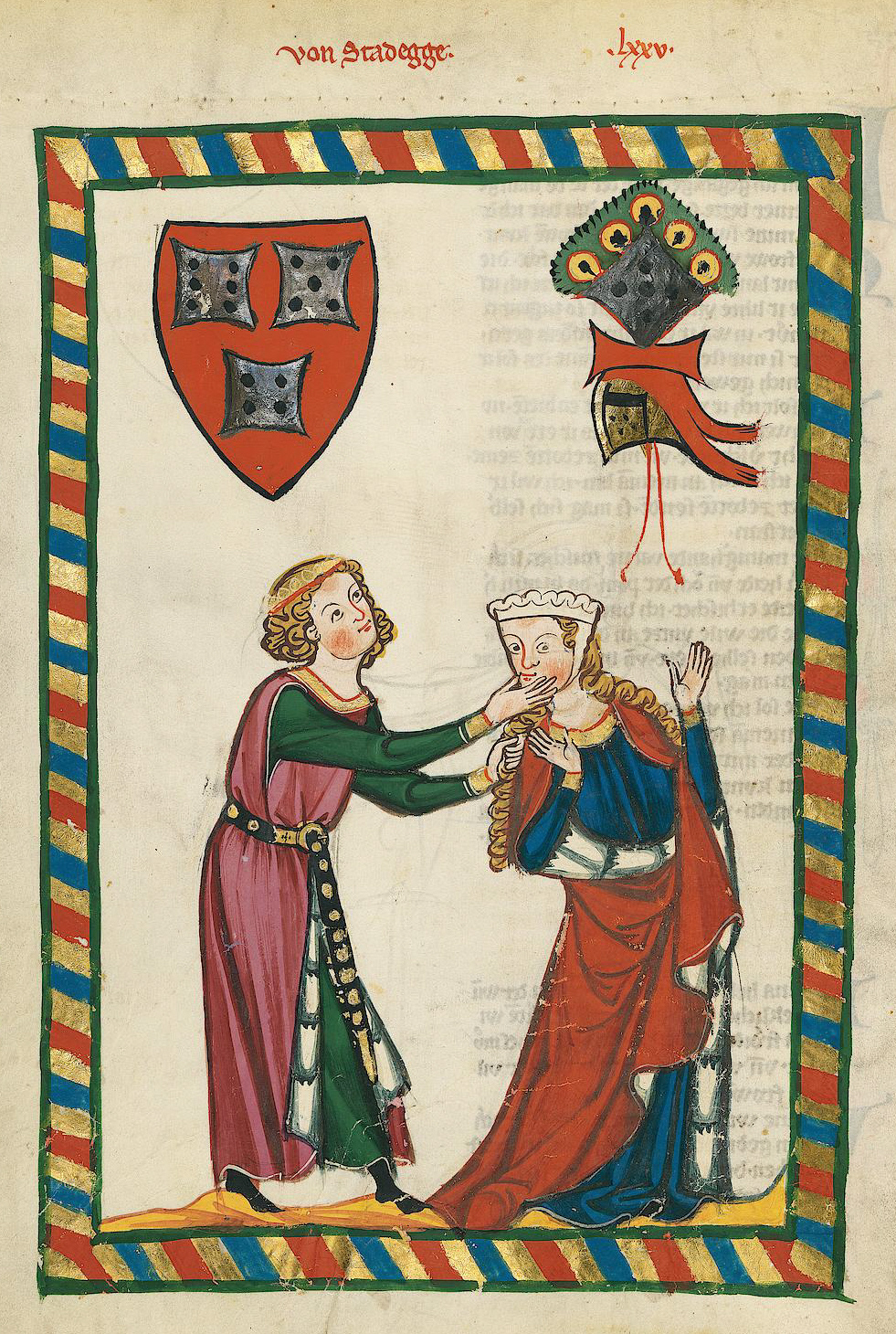
Depiction of Rudolph II Stadeck in Codex Manesse. The coat of arms with three dice is fictional; the historical arms of the family had a lion as heraldic charge.

Stadeck was an important family of ministeriales in Styria during the 13th and 14th centuries.

The family is named for Stattegg castle, beginning with Rudolph I (1192–1230). His son Rudolph II (d. 1261) was a leading minnesinger, featured in Codex Manesse.

Another son of Rudolph I, Hartnid I, was active in the party of Rudolph I of Germany in the feud against Ottokar I of Bohemia.

The male line of the family died out with Johann of Stadeck in 1399.
