= Lodín =

- Municipality
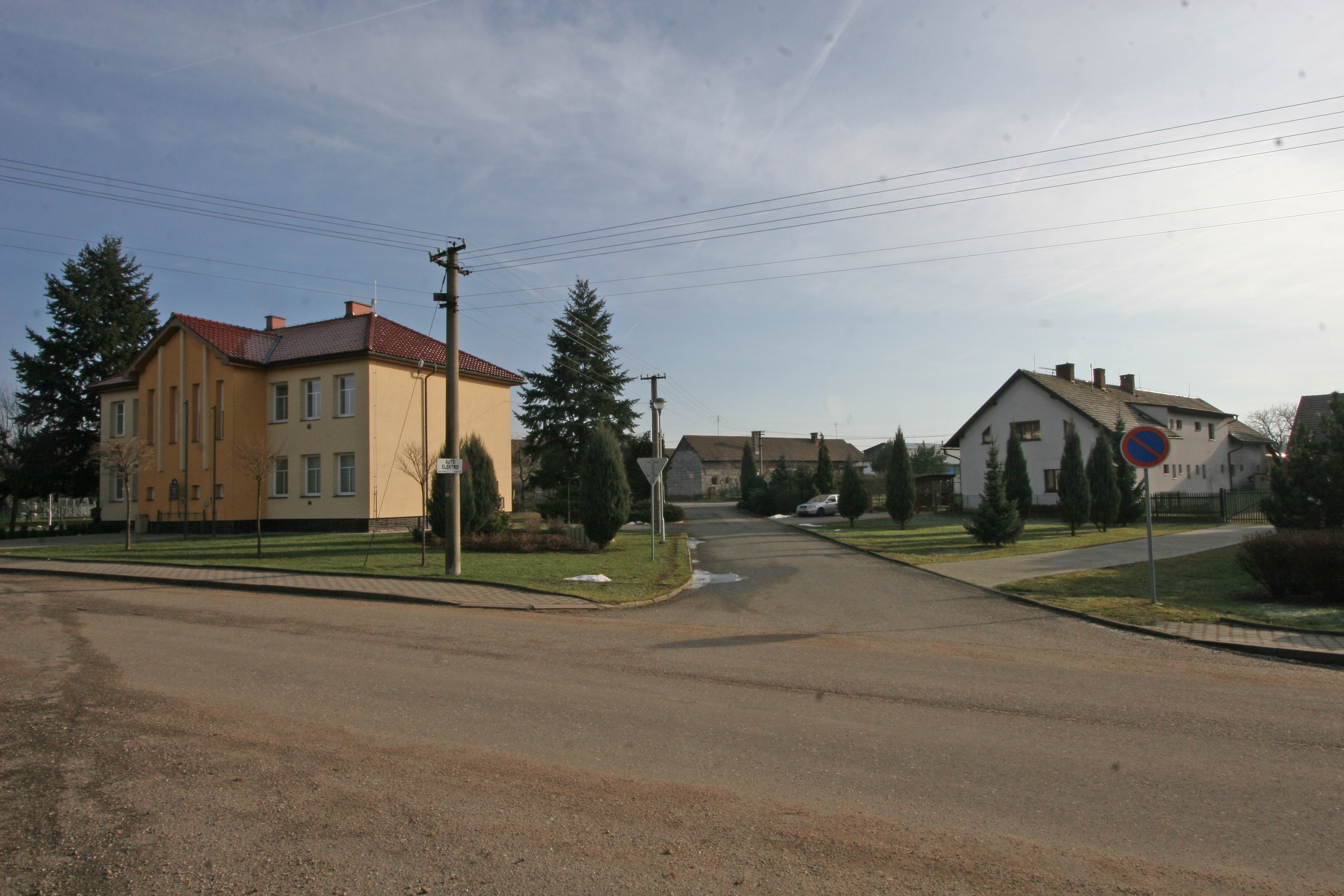
- Municipal office

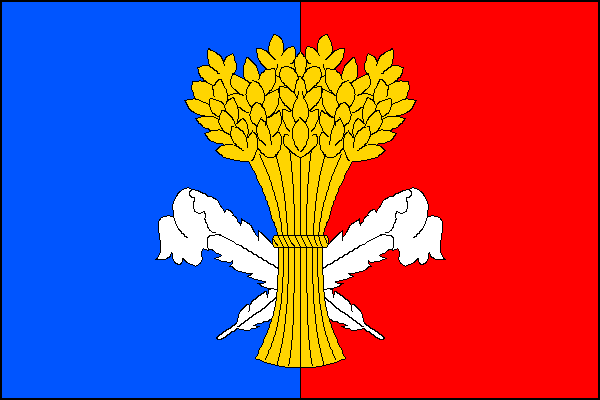
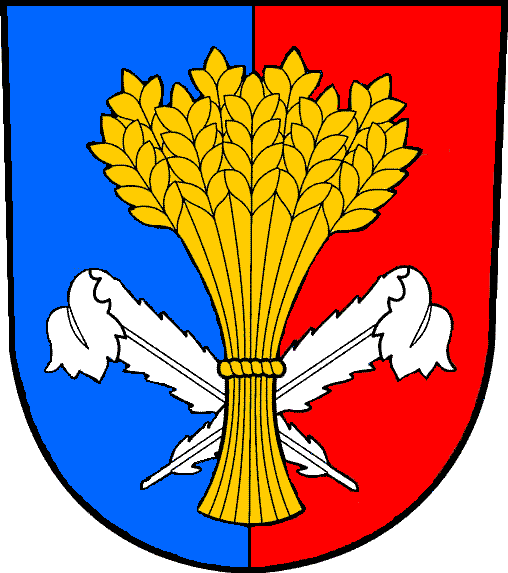
- Flag Coat of arms

- Location in the Czech Republic
- Coordinates: 50°16′15″N 15°36′38″E
- Country: Czech Republic
- Region: Hradec Králové
- District: Hradec Králové
- First mentioned: 1073

Area
  - Total: 7.71 km^{2} (2.98 sq mi)
- Elevation: 254 m (833 ft)

Population (2026-01-01)
  - Total: 433
  - Density: 56.2/km^{2} (145/sq mi)
- Time zone: UTC+1 (CET)
  - Summer (DST): UTC+2 (CEST)
- Postal code: 503 15
- Website: www.lodin.cz

Lodín (Czech pronunciation: [ˈloɟiːn]) is a municipality and village in Hradec Králové District in the Hradec Králové Region of the Czech Republic. It has about 400 inhabitants.

== Administrative division ==
Lodín consists of two municipal parts (in brackets population according to the 2021 census):

- Lodín (385)
- Janatov (45)

== Demographics ==
Historical population
Year	Pop.	±%
1869	525	—
1880	571	+8.8%
1890	606	+6.1%
1900	566	−6.6%
1910	571	+0.9%
1921	532	−6.8%
1930	527	−0.9%
1950	419	−20.5%
1961	374	−10.7%
1970	322	−13.9%
1980	297	−7.8%
1991	291	−2.0%
2001	281	−3.4%
2011	361	+28.5%
2021	430	+19.1%
Source: Censuses
