= Harrach family =

Austro-Bohemian noble family

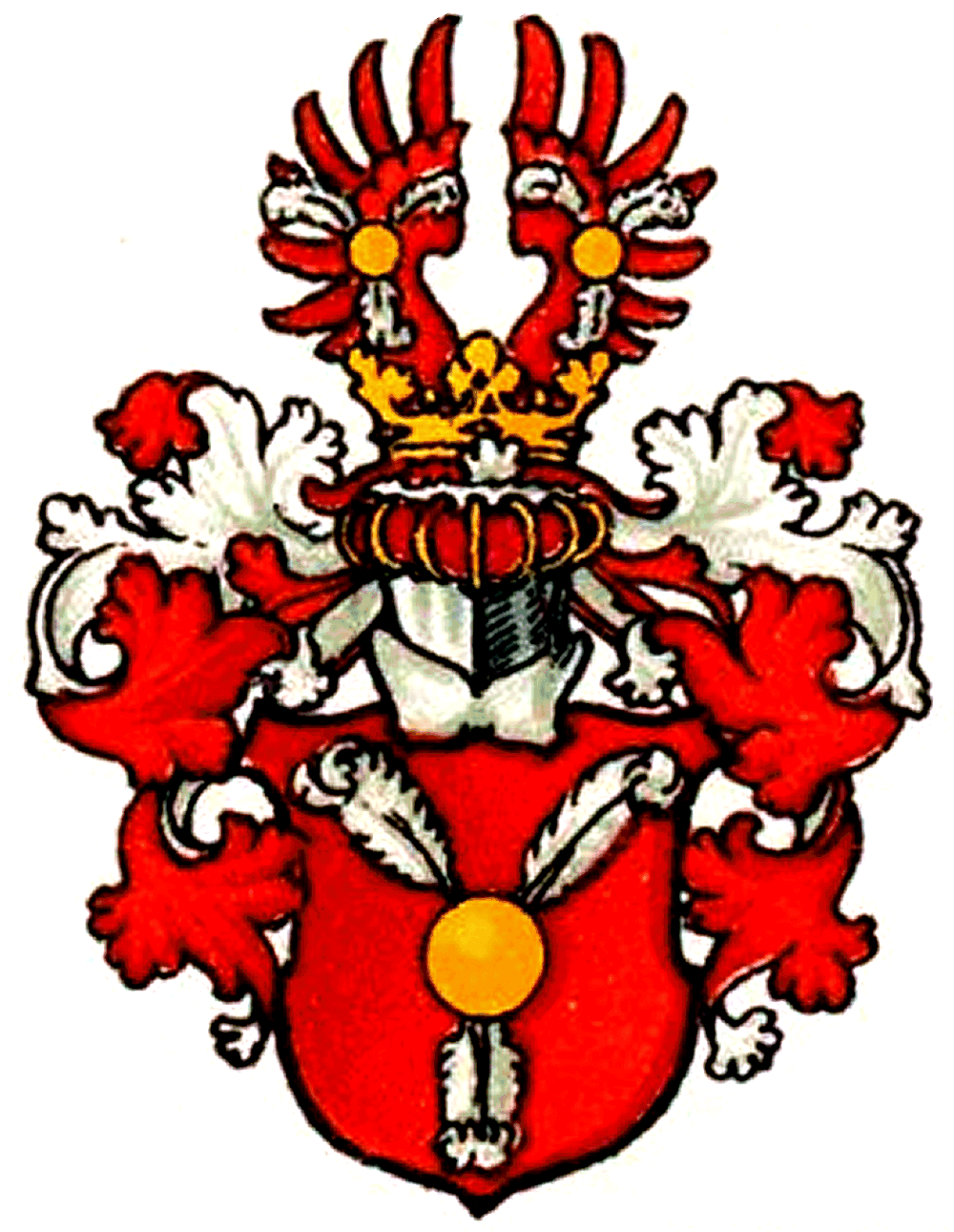
Original arms of the family

The House of Harrach is an old and influential Austrian noble family, which was also part of the Bohemian nobility. The Grafen (Counts) of Harrach were among the most prominent families in the Habsburg Empire. As one of a small number of mediatised houses, the family belongs to the Uradel (ancient nobility).

== History ==
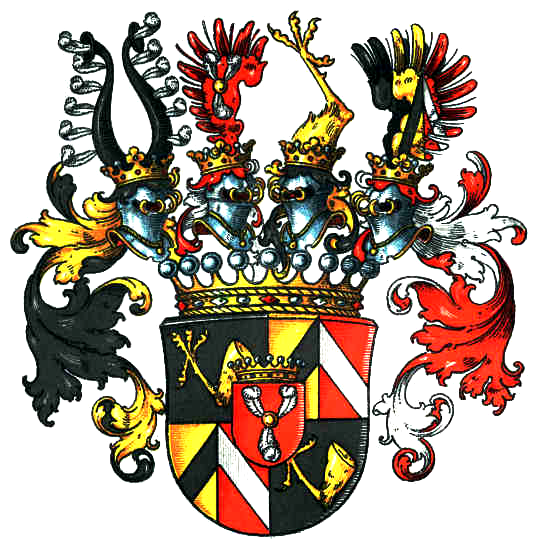
Arms of the Counts of Harrach zu Rohrau und Thannhausen

The family first appeared in 1195 in documents found at Ranshofen Abbey in the Duchy of Bavaria. There are two main family branches – the Rohrau branch in Austria (until 1886) and the Jilemnice branch in Bohemia – which were established by two sons of Count Karl von Harrach (1570–1628). Two branches were later founded by grandsons of Friedrich August von Harrach-Rohrau – Ernest Christopher Joseph (d. 1838) and Ferdinand Joseph (d. 1841).

- 1195 — first mention of the family in Ranshofen monastery.
- 14th century — owned lands in Austria, Carinthia and Styria.
- 1524 — Leonhard III von Harrach acquired Rohrau Castle.
- 4 January 1552 — Leonhard IV von Harrach (d. 1590) received the title of Imperial Baron from Charles V, Holy Roman Emperor.
- 6 November 1627 — Karl von Harrach (1570–1628) received the title of Imperial Count from Ferdinand II, Holy Roman Emperor.
- 1701 — Ferdinand Bonaventura I purchased Jilemnice.
- 1706 — Franz Anton von Harrach was raised ad personam to the rank of Fürst (Prince of the Holy Roman Empire) by Joseph I.
- 1708 — Aloys Thomas Raimund von Harrach married Countess Cecilia von Thannhausen and attached her surname to his family name.

== Residences ==
The family owned the following properties at various times:

- Rohrau Castle, Rohrau, Austria: formerly the seat of the elder branch; with notable private collection of paintings known as Graf Harrach’sche Familiensammlung (from 1870–1970 kept in Palais Harrach). Rohrau has meanwhile been inherited by the counts of Waldburg-Zeil.
- Prugg Castle, Bruck an der Leitha, Austria: still the seat of the younger branch.
- Palais Harrach an der Freyung, Vienna, Austria (sold to the city in 1975).
- Palais Harrach in der Ungargasse, Vienna, Austria.
- Palais Harrach, Prague, Czech Republic.
- Harrachov (Harrachsdorf): town in Czech Republic with family's glass manufactory (since 1712), well known as Harrachglas brand.
- Hrádek u Nechanic, Czech Republic.
- Jilemnice, Czech Republic.
- Konárovice, Czech Republic.
- Kunín, Czech Republic.
- Lodín, Czech Republic
- Náměšť na Hané, Czech Republic.
- Strkov, Czech Republic.
- Krzeczyn Mały, Poland.
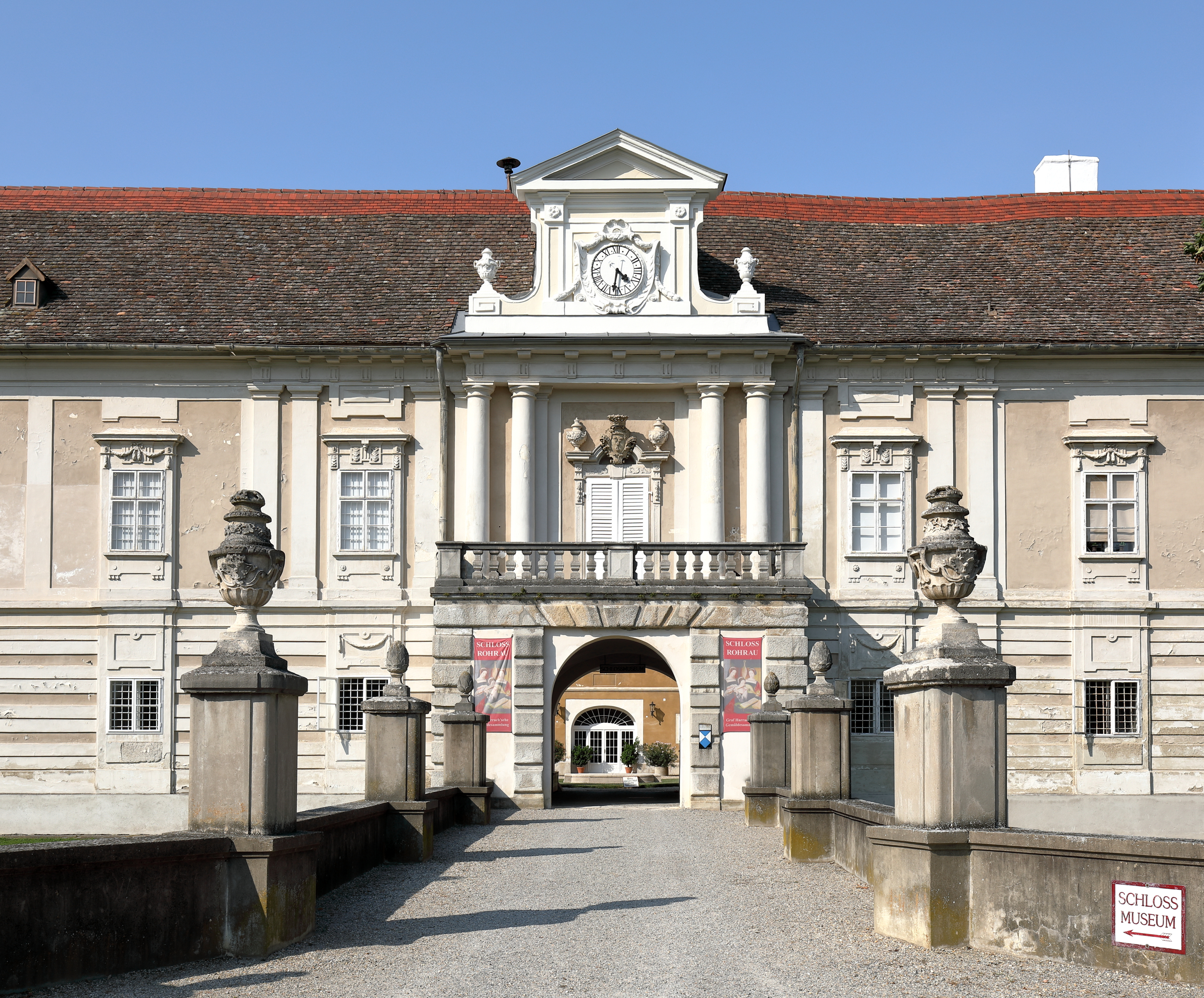
Rohrau Castle in Rohrau, Austria

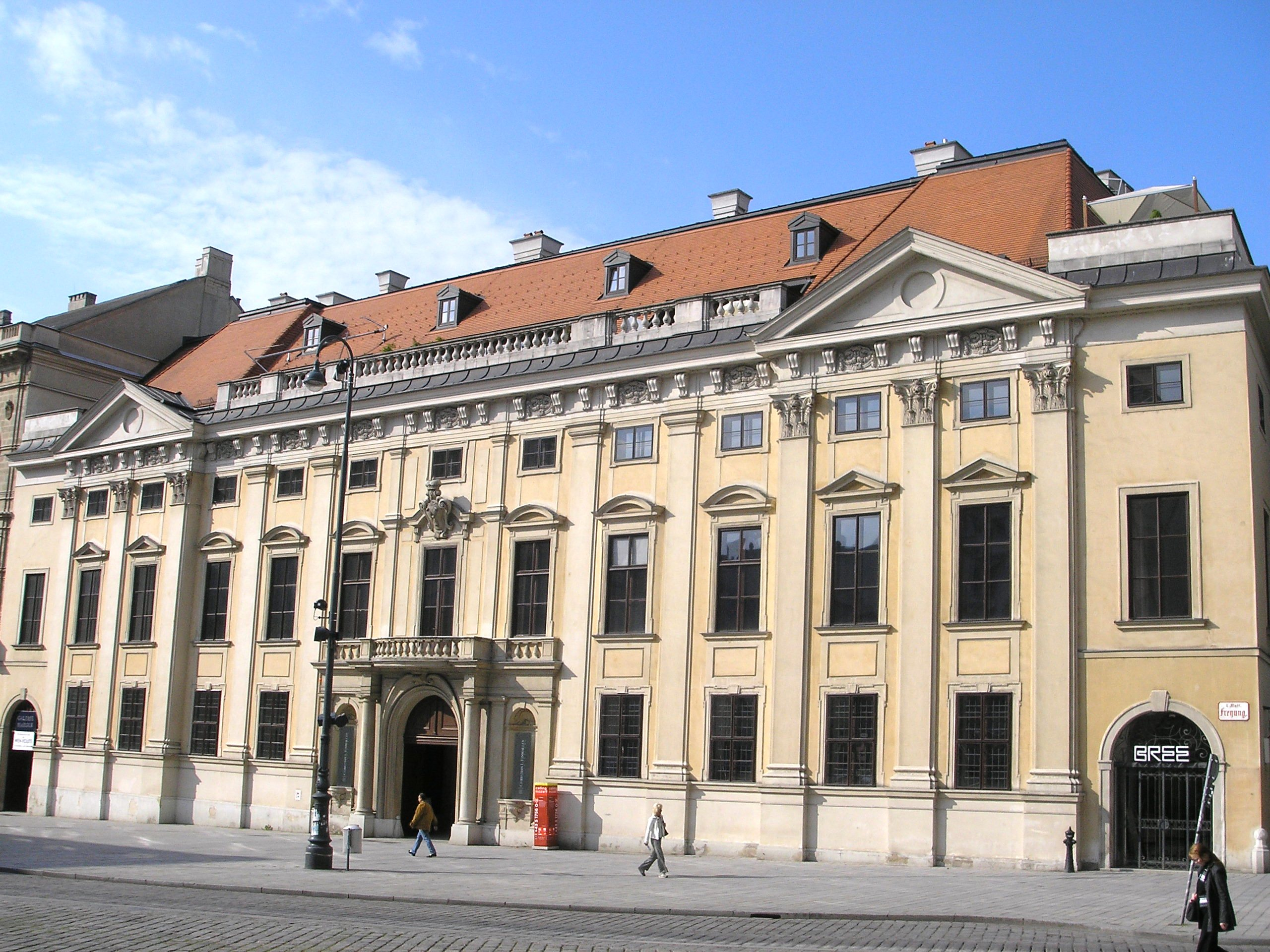
Palais Harrach in Vienna, Austria

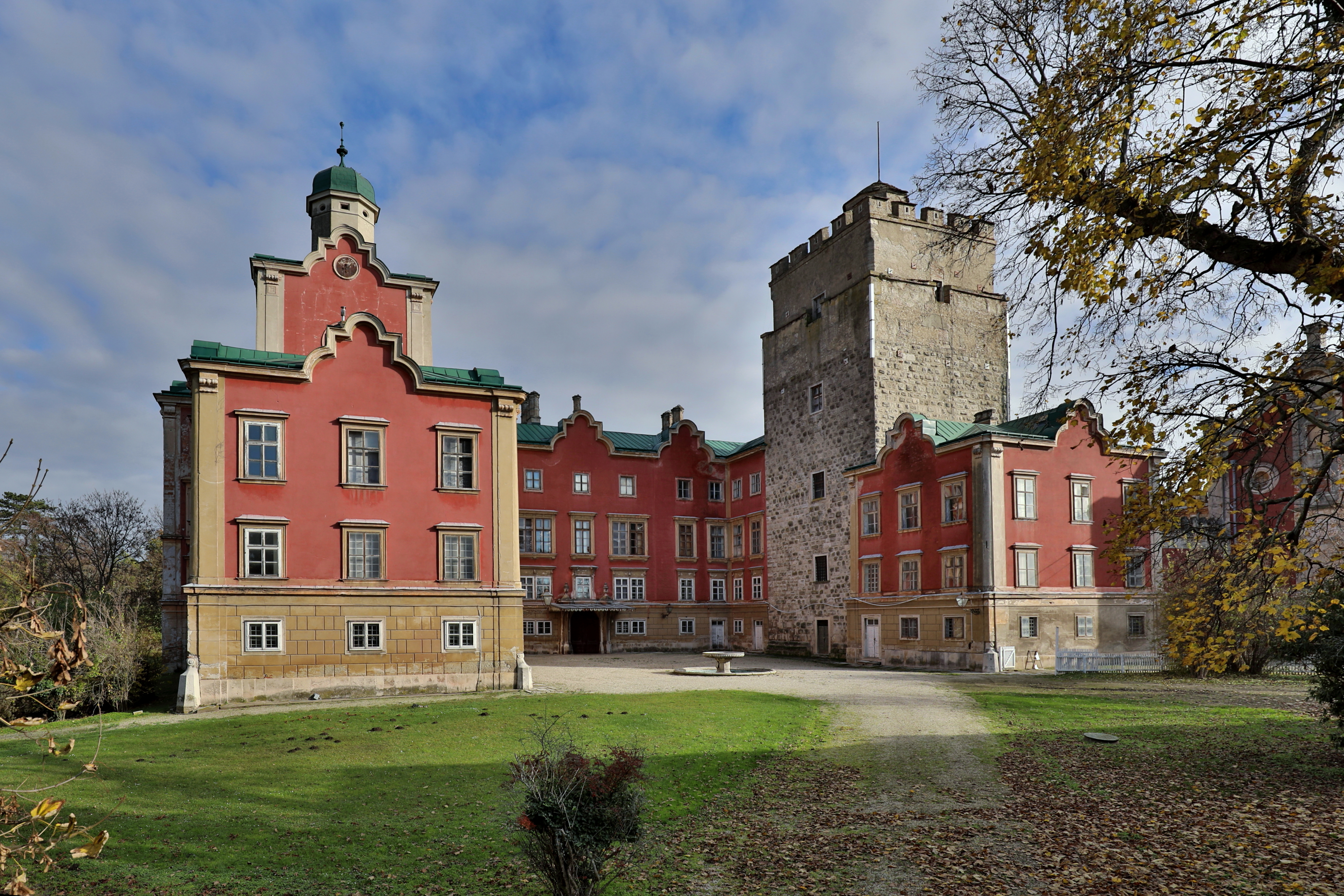
Prugg Castle in Bruck an der Leitha, Austria

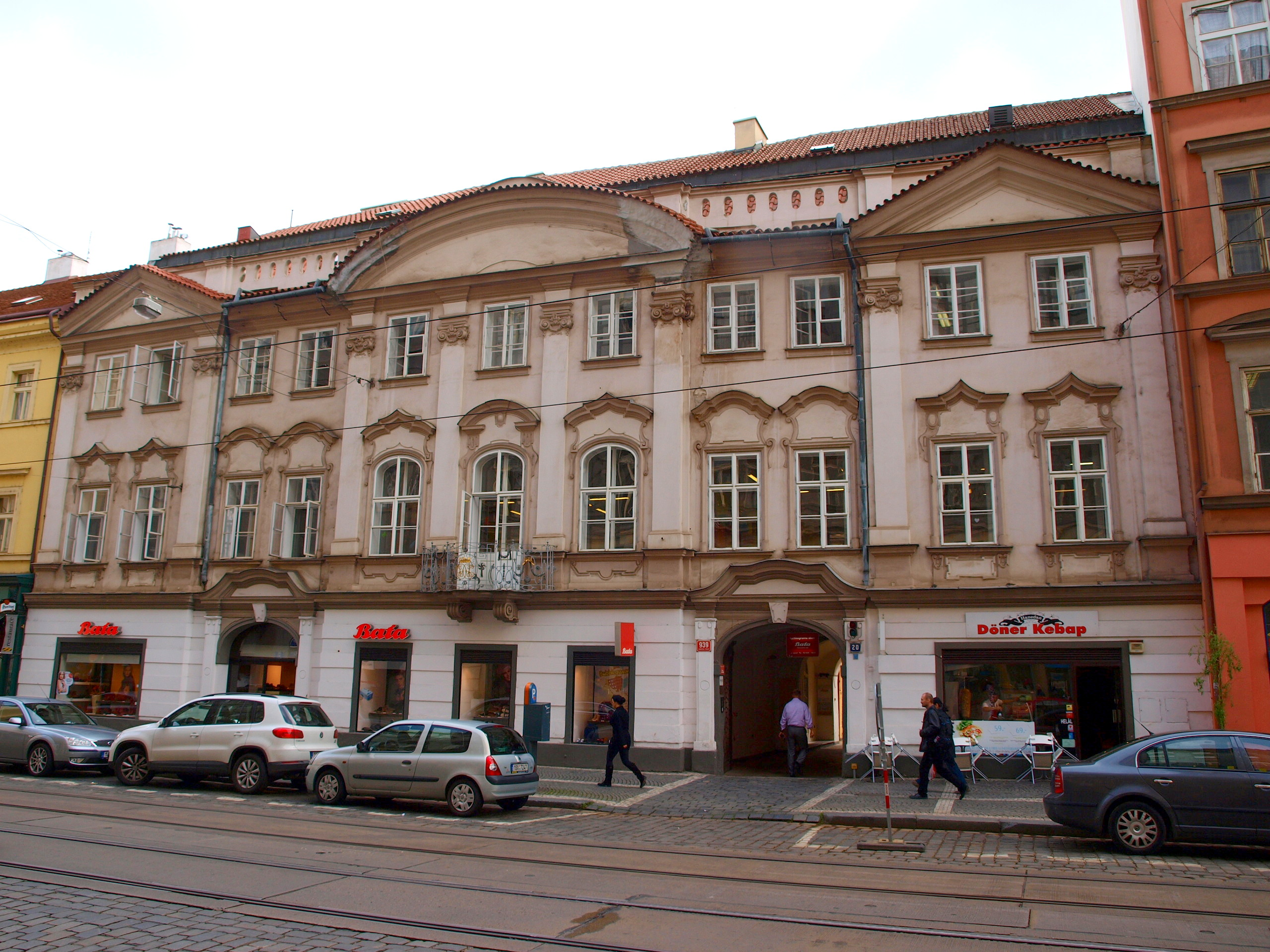
Palais Harrach in Prague, Czech Republic

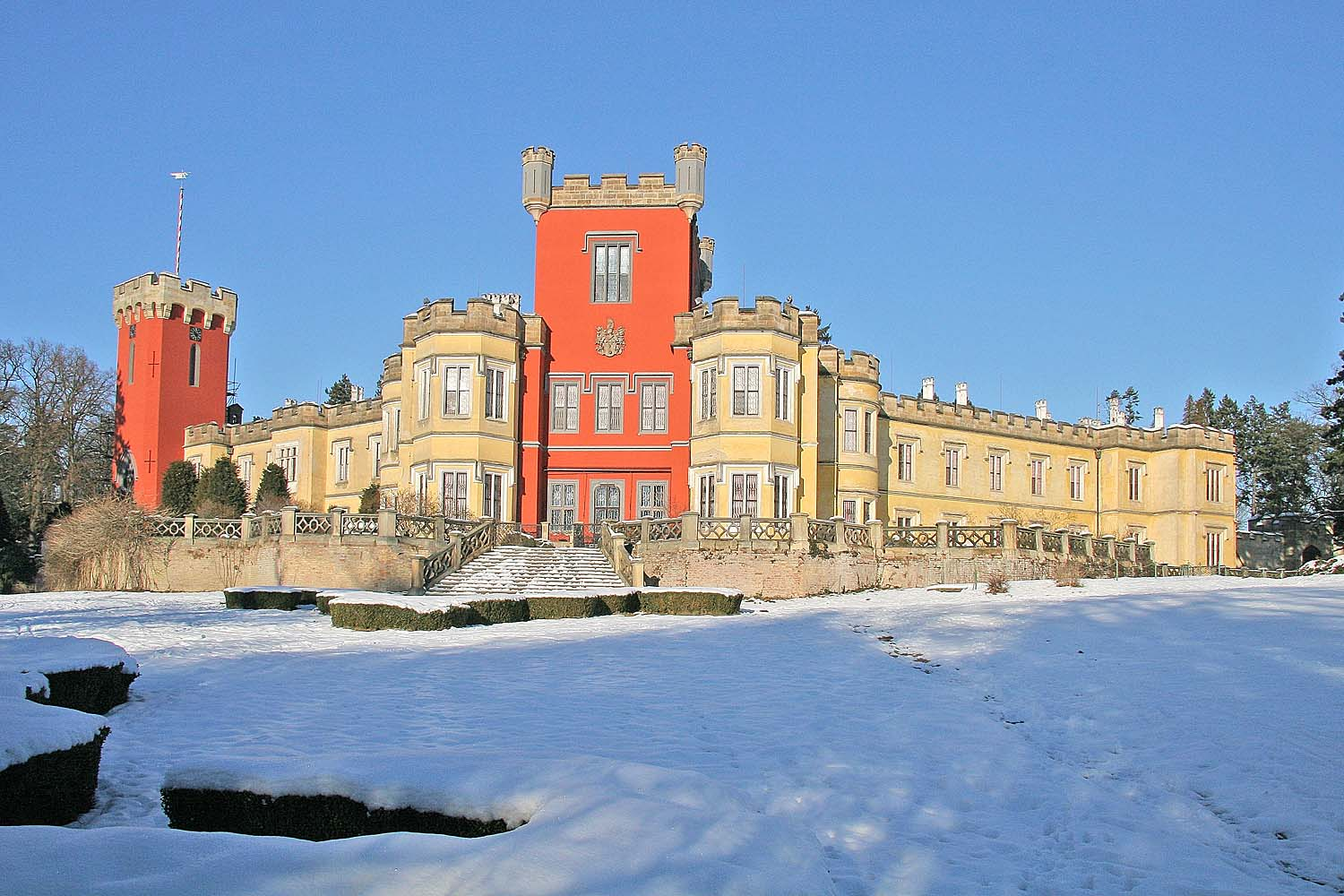
Hrádek u Nechanic, Czech Republic

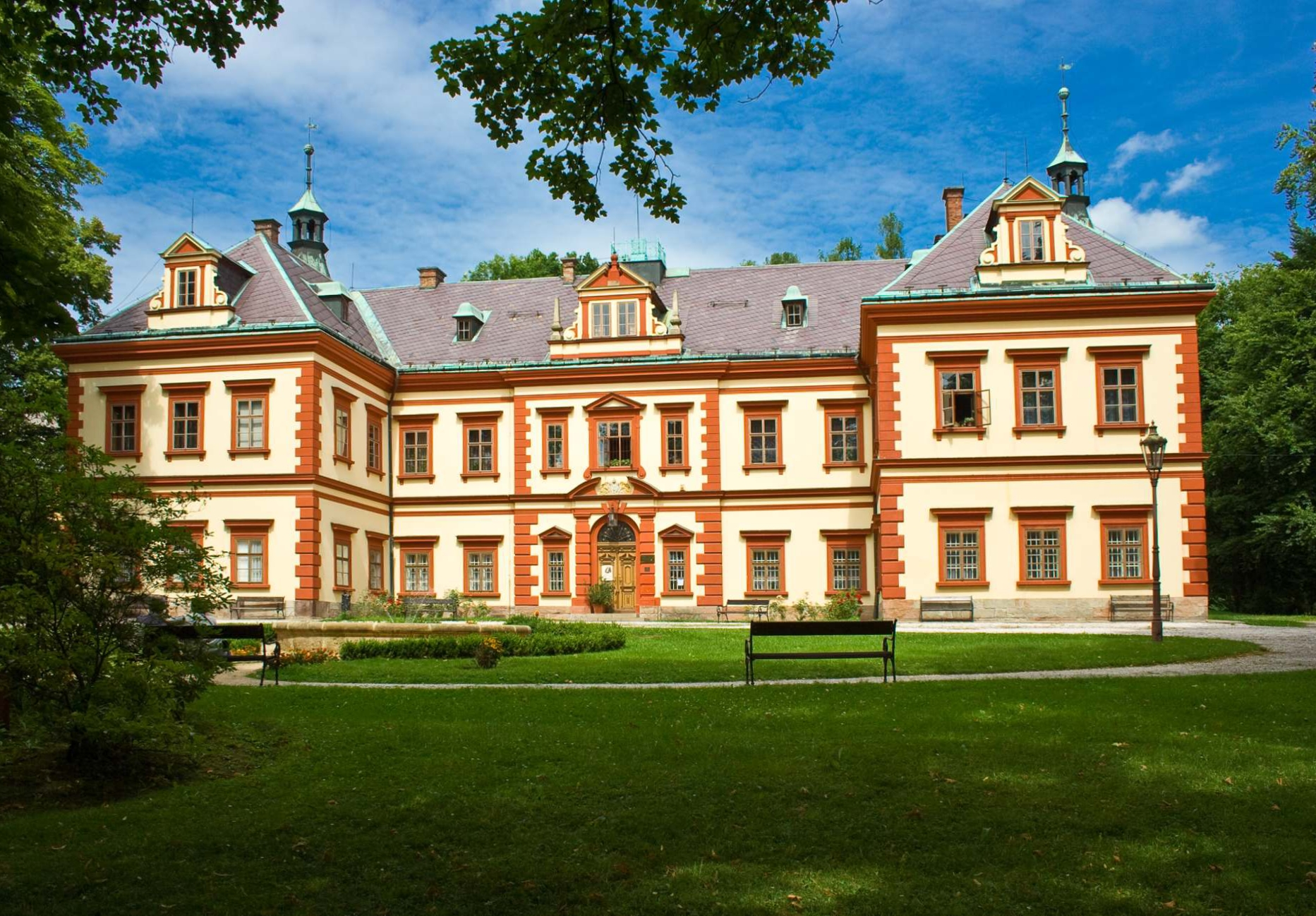
Jilemnice, Czech Republic

== Notable family members ==
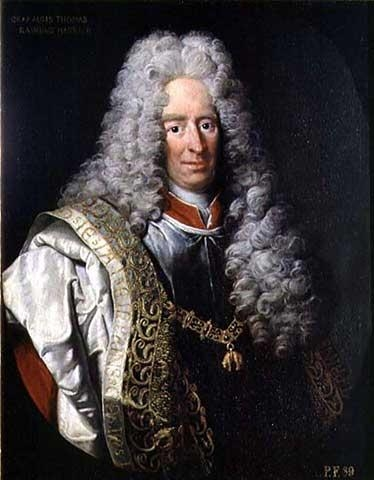
Aloys Thomas Raimund Graf Harrach (1669–1742), viceroy of Naples

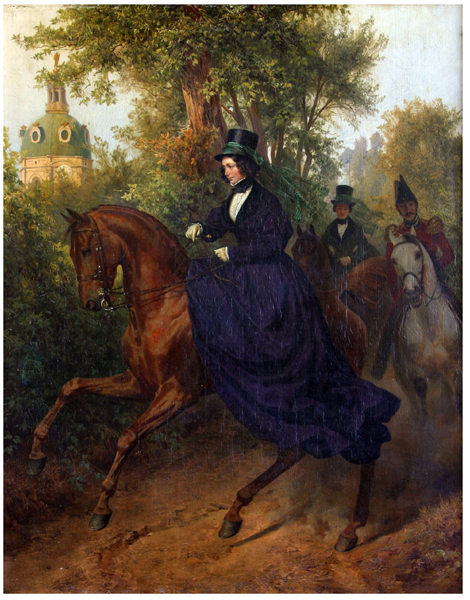
Auguste von Harrach, princess of Liegnitz (1800–1873), second wife of king Frederick William III of Prussia

Many of its members bear the title of Graf (count/earl) or Gräfin (countess). Notable members of the family are, among others:

- Przibislaus Harrach (d. 1289) — founder of the family
- Leonhard IV von Harrach (d. 1590)
- Karl von Harrach (1570–1628) — his grandson, Imperial envoy to German sovereigns' courts, Ferdinand II's favourite. His children:
  - Ernst Adalbert von Harrach (1598–1667), Archbishop of Prague, Cardinal and Prince-Bishop of Trent.
  - Leonhard (d. 1645), founder of the Rohrau line, the Superior Marshall at the Emperor Ferdinand III Habsburg's court.
  - Otto Frederick (d. 1639) founder of the Jilemnice line, soldier and diplomat, brother-in-law of Albrecht von Wallenstein. His son:
    - Ferdinand Bonaventura I Graf Harrach (1637–1706), ambassador in Spain before War of the Spanish Succession. His children:
      - Franz Anton Graf von Harrach (1665–1727) — Bishop of Vienna and Archbishop of Salzburg
      - Aloys Thomas Raimund Graf Harrach (1669–1742), Viceroy of Naples. His children:
        - Johann Ernst Emanuel (d. 1739), Bishop of Nitra
        - Ferdinand Bonaventura II (1708–1778), Governor of Milan
        - Friedrich August von Harrach-Rohrau (1696–1749), Governor of the Austrian Netherlands. His grandsons:
          - Ernest Christopher Joseph (1757-1838)
          - Ferdinand Joseph (d. 1841). His children:
            - Auguste von Harrach (1800–1873) — second wife to king Frederick William III of Prussia
            - Karl Philip (d. 1878). His son:
              - Ferdinand (1832–1915) — painter.
- Johann Philipp Graf von Harrach (1678–1764), Austrian field marshal
- Ernst Guido (1732–1783)
- Maria Josefa von Harrach (1727–1788), Princess of Liechtenstein, wife of Johann Nepomuk Karl, Prince of Liechtenstein
- Karl Borromäus von Harrach (1761–1829) — honorary Chief Physician at the Elisabethine Hospital in Vienna.
- Johann Nepomuk von Harrach (1828–1909) — Czech politician
- Lieutenant Colonel Count Franz von Harrach (1870–1937), Franz Ferdinand's friend who was present when he was assassinated in Sarajevo on June 28, 1914.
- Stephanie von Harrach (b. 1967), writer
- Beppo Harrach, modern rally pilot, count Ernst Harrach's son

== See also ==
- List of counts of Austria-Hungary
- Mediatized houses
