= Azerbaijan's space program =

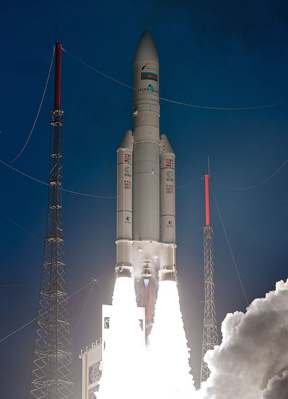
Launch of Azerspace-1 artificial satellite from Kuru Cosmodrome

Azerbaijan's space program is the program of the Azerbaijani government to develop Azerbaijan's space capabilities.

"Azercosmos", the first satellite operator in the South Caucasus, was established by the Decree No. 885 of the President of the Republic of Azerbaijan Ilham Aliyev dated May 3, 2010, with the aim of ensuring the development, launch, management and operation of telecommunication satellites.

On February 8, 2013, Azerbaijan launched the first artificial satellite named Azerspace-1 into space.

== Background ==
Azerbaijan has had a scientific interest in space travel since the Second World War. In 1927, the decree of conducting astronomical expeditions in the Azerbaijan SSR was issued for the purpose of selecting the southern regional observatory of the Leningrad Institute of Astronomy. For this purpose, in July–August 1930, the employees of that institute A.V. Markov and V.B.Nikonov together with I.A. Benashvili, employee of Azerbaijan scientific society, studied astroclimate in Khankendi, Shusha and Lachin regions, but the lack of cloudless nights dissuaded them from this idea. As a result, it was decided to continue observations in other mountainous regions of Azerbaijan for the purpose of selecting an astronomical observation point. However, the lack of local staff did not allow organizing long-term observation work.

Habibulla Mammadbeyli, who graduated from Leningrad State University in 1938 from the Faculty of Physics and Mathematics, taught astronomy in his native language at Baku State University, prepared textbooks in this field, widely promoted astronomy and in 1946-1949 under his leadership in different regions of Azerbaijan (Kalbajar, Khizi, Dashkasan, The expeditions he conducted in Shamakhi and other areas) helped to choose the place of the future observatory in the republic and formed experts in the field of astronomy.

In order to determine the location of the future observatory, the last uninterrupted expeditions were organized under the leadership of Hajibey Sultanov at the Institute of Physics and Mathematics of the Azerbaijan SSR AS (Academy of Sciences) in March 1953, and the final decision about the suitable location in Shamakhi was made in June of the same year. In 1959, the Shamakhi Astrophysics Observatory was established by the decision of the Council of Ministers of the Azerbaijan SSR on the basis of the Astrophysics Sector and its Pirgulu Astronomy Station. Since 1960, this observatory has been included in the SA structure of the Azerbaijan SSR as an independent research institute.

Karim Karimov, one of the founders of the Soviet space program, played a major role in the creation of space vehicles and the program by which the first man in the world to be sent into space. As a result, after the successful completion of the historic flight of the first cosmonaut Yuri Gagarin, Karim Karimov was awarded the highest order of the USSR – the Order of Lenin. Karim Karimov, who started working as a senior engineer in 1946, was also given the rank of major-general. In 1965, he was appointed the head of the Department of Space Vehicles, and from 1966, the chairman of the USSR State Commission for Test Flights of Piloted Ships.

Since 1974, the Azerbaijan National Aerospace Agency has operated as the "Caspian" Scientific Center within the Azerbaijan National Academy of Sciences, and in 1981, the Space Research Scientific-Production Union (KTEIB) was established at its base. By Decree No. 580 of the President of the Republic of Azerbaijan dated February 21, 1992, AMAKA was established on the basis of KTEIB. By Decree No. 463 of the President of the Republic of Azerbaijan dated September 27, 2006, AMAKA (later MAKA) was subordinated to the Ministry of Defense Industry of the Republic of Azerbaijan.

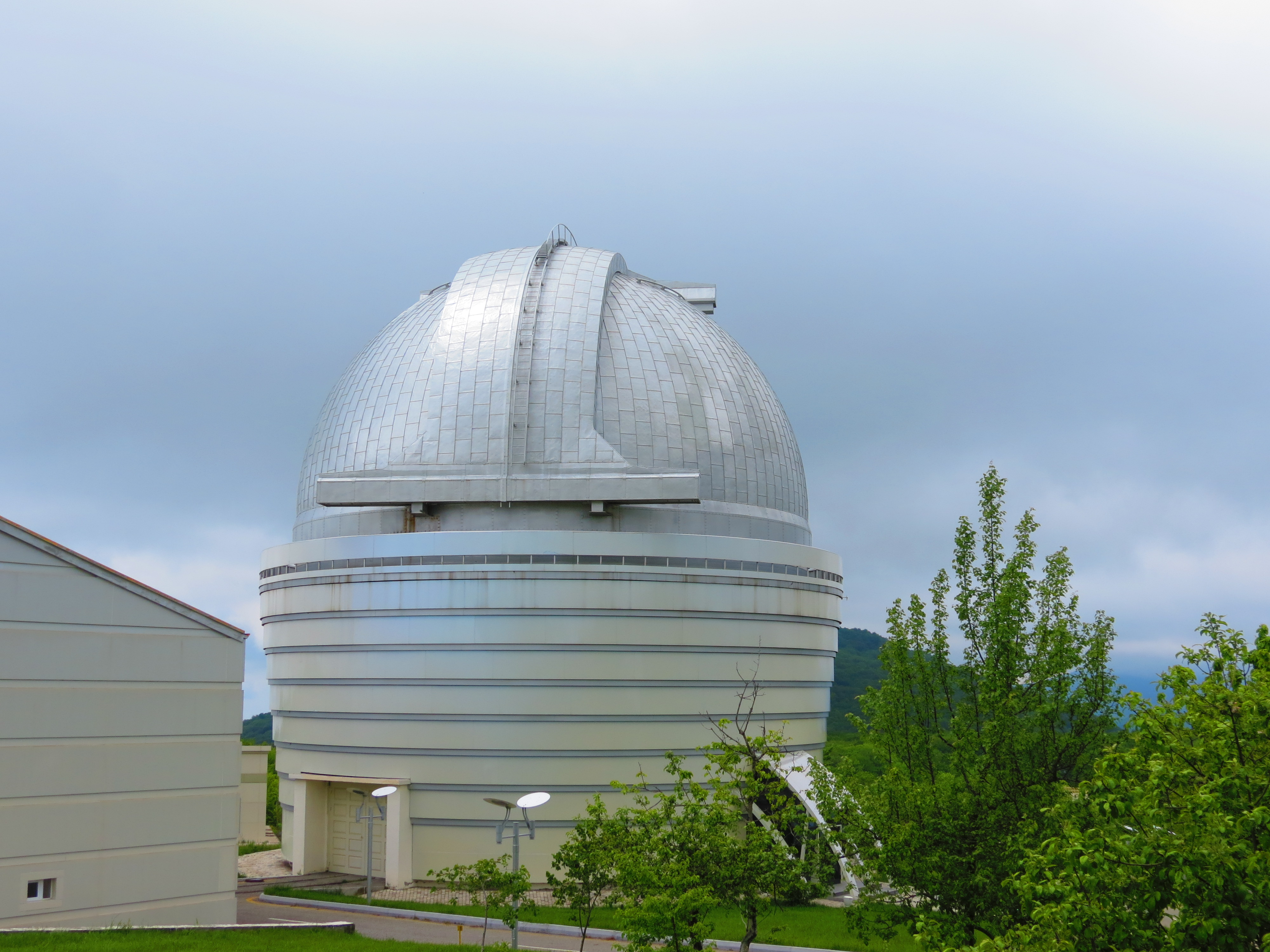
Shamakhy Astrophysical Observatory

In 1977, the American Mugham was sent into space as a result of the Voyager 1 satellite belonging to NASA. The Voyager gold plate made by the American astronomer Carl Sagan also contained a composition called "Mugham" (sometimes called "Chahargah melody") played by Kamil Jalilov with the balaban.

Azerbaijani astronomer and astrophysicist Nadir Ibrahimov made great achievements in the study of planets (Mars, Venus and Jupiter's satellite Io) as a result of his observations in the 2-meter telescope of the Shamakhi Astrophysical Observatory. He took large-scale, multiple images of the planet Mars during its great opposition (the shortest distance between Earth and Mars) and mapped the planet. A crater on the surface of Mars was named in his honour at the General Assembly of the International Astronomical Union in Patras, Greece in August 1982. The crater, which has a diameter of 87 km, is located east of Thaumasia Plateau.

Fuzuli Farajov dedicated a certain part of his life to the design and production of flying machines of the XXI century. He was one of the participants in the assembly of the fuselage of the spaceship "Buran" and spent a lot of work on the creation of the spaceship. General Karim Karimov, academician Tofig Ismayilov, engineers Vafadar Babayev, Izzateli Agayev, Ferdowsi Karimov, department head of "Molniya" design office Nazim Guliyev, and Shakir Asgarov, who looked after security issues at the Baikonur cosmodrome, also took part in the creation of the spaceship.

The first Azerbaijani-born cosmonaut to enter space was Musa Manarov. Manarov, who made his first flight on December 21, 1987, under the command of cosmonaut Vladimir Titov as a flight engineer aboard the "Soyuz TM-4" spacecraft of the "Mir" interorbital station, returned to Earth exactly 1 year — 365 days and 23 hours later, making it the longest time in space for that time. was one of the two Earth inhabitants. For this heroism, he was given the title Hero of the Soviet Union. Manarov was in space for the second time from December 21, 1990, to May 26, 1991. For 175 days and 2 hours, he orbited the Earth as a flight engineer on the Soyuz-11 spacecraft of the Mir orbital complex. During his two flights, Musa went into space 7 times and spent a total of 34 hours and 23 minutes in outer space.

In 2014, Allen Mirgadirov and 5 others were selected by the NASA commission for the most similar experiment to the flight to Mars. In practice, Allen was responsible for the technical condition of the equipment, including the computers, its operational condition, and the flight route. In addition to general duties, he also had his own experience. He was involved in the development of a computer program that optimized the flight trajectory.

== History ==
=== Satellite programs of Azerbaijan ===
In 2008, the decrees of President Ilham Aliyev on the approval of the State Program on the creation and development of the space industry in Azerbaijan and the launch of telecommunication satellites into orbit in 2008 showed that the state is quite interested in the development of this field. After that, in 2010, the president signed the Decree on the establishment of "Azercosmos" Open Joint-Stock Company, and that institution was given a special task related to the production and launching of a telecommunication satellite, and the creation of the main and backup Earth Satellite Control Center. "Azerkosmos", the first satellite operator in Azerbaijan and the South Caucasus, during the two years of its existence, worked in the direction of providing television and radio broadcasting and telecommunication services in the country, as well as providing highly reliable communication platforms that meet the requirements of government and corporate clients.

On February 8, 2013, Azerbaijan launched its first artificial satellite, Azerspace-1. The flight from Kourou Cosmodrome in French Guiana took place between 01:36 and 02:20 at night. The satellite is named Azerspace-1/Africasat-1a because its coverage includes Central Asia, Europe and Africa. 230 million Azerbaijani manats were spent to create the satellite. 15 percent of this amount was paid from the state budget, the rest with loans. Loans in the amount of 98 million US dollars were taken from France's COFACE Export Credit Agency and 116.6 million US dollars from BNP Paribas bank with the guarantee of US Export-Import Bank (US Em-Im).

Azerbaijan launched the Azersky observation satellite into orbit on June 30, 2014. The satellite, worth 157 million euros, mainly serves the defence and security of Azerbaijan.

Azerbaijan's third satellite, Azerspace-2, was launched into space on September 28, 2018. Launched from the Kourou Cosmodrome in French Guiana, the satellite went into orbit at 2:38 on the night of September 26. The cost of the satellite is 190 million US dollars.

== List of projects ==
Azerbaijan's space program has implemented a number of projects:

- Azersky (observation satellite)
- Azerspace-1 (communication satellite)
- Azerspace-2 (communication satellite)

== See also ==
- Azercosmos
- Azerbaijan National Aerospace Agency
