= List of Azerbaijani scientists and philosophers =

This is a comprehensive list of notable Azerbaijani scientists and philosophers, arranged alphabetically.

== Scientists and philosophers ==
- Ali Abbasov — physicist, specialized in the field of microelectronics
- Hasan Abdullayev — Lenin-prize winning physicist, specialized in the field of semiconductors research, President of the Azerbaijan Academy of Sciences in 1970-1983
- Zarifa Aliyeva — ophthalmologist, devised and introduced new methods for treatment of ocular diseases
- Ahliman Amiraslanov — oncologist, professor and rector of Azerbaijan Medical University
- Hamid Arasly — philologist, specialized in Azerbaijani literary studies, history and linguistics
- Adil Asadov — philosopher, specialized in aesthetics, philosophy of thinking, philosophy of politics
- Abbasgulu Bakikhanov — philosopher, historian and writer, founder of Azerbaijani scientific historiography
- Seyid Yahya Bakuvi — scientist and philosopher of the late medieval era in the fields of mathematics and astronomy
- Vagif Guliyev — mathematician, specializes in the fields lie groups and homogeneous spaces
- Zumrud Gulu-zade — philosopher, professor of philosophy at the Azerbaijan National Academy of Sciences
- Elshan Hajizadeh — economic scientist, specialized in the problems of economy and management of fuel and energy complex
- Ashraf Huseynov — mathematician, first to study the nonlinear Hilbert problem as applied to analytic functions, created the H_{α, β, γ} function space and proved some theorems for nonlinear singular integral equations with Cauchy kernel within that space
- Heydar Huseynov — philosopher, specialized in dialectical materialism
- Nadir Ibrahimov — astrophysicist, astronomer of the Shamakhy Astrophysical Observatory of the Azerbaijan National Academy of Sciences, Ibragimov crater on Mars is named in his honor
- Hamlet Isakhanli — mathematician, science writer, founder of Khazar University
- Ishag Jafarzadeh — archeologist, a pioneer of archaeology and ethnography in Azerbaijan
- Ali Javan — physicist and inventor at MIT with main contributions in the fields of quantum physics and spectroscopy, co-inventor of the gas laser
- Alexander Kazembek — philologist, organizer of the Russian Oriental Studies
- George Kechaari — philologist, specialized in the Udi language
- Dzhangir Kerimov — philosopher, specializes in philosophical problems of legal science, social planning and administration, theory of state and law
- Kerim Kerimov — rocket scientist, one of the founders of the Soviet space industry, for many years a central figure in the Soviet space program, Hero of Socialist Labor
- Yusif Kerimov — electrical engineer and inventor
- Salahaddin Khalilov — philosopher, specializes in philosophy of science, science about science, philosophical comparativism, phenomenology, philosophical aspects of Eastern and Western Civilizations, philosophy of Abu Turkhan and cognitive theory
- Zahid Khalilov — mathematician and engineer, solved the boundary value problem for polyharmonic equations, proposed abstract generalizations of singular integral operators, founder of the Azerbaijani functional analysis school
- Firudin bey Kocharli — philologist, writer and literary critic
- Fuad Mamedov — social scientist, specializes in culturology, founder of Culturology in Azerbaijan, President of Cultural Association Simurgh
- Vasim Mammadaliyev — philosopher and theologian, specializes in oriental studies and Arabic philology
- Yusif Mammadaliyev — chemist, founder of petrochemical science in Azerbaijan
- Garib Mammadov — agronomist
- Yaqub Mammadov — physiologist, specializes in pathophysiology
- Zakir Mammadov — philosopher, specializes in Eastern philosophy, especially history of Azerbaijani philosophy
- Izzet Orujova — chemist, specialized in oil
- Mirali Qashqai — geologist in the fields of geomorphology and stratigraphy
- Arif Salimov — mathematician, known for research in differential geometry
- Farman Salmanov — geologist, first discovered oil fields in Siberia, Hero of Socialist Labor
- Movlazadeh Mahammad Hasan Shakavi — philosopher, theologian, alim, first Sheikh ul-Islam of the Caucasus, first scholar who translated the Koran into the Azerbaijani language
- Zeynalabdin Shirvani — philosopher, poet, traveller and geographer of the pre-Tsarist era
- Hajibey Sultanov — astronomer
- Lotfi A. Zadeh — mathematician, electrical engineer, computer scientist, founder of the fuzzy set theory and fuzzy logic
