= Salatin =

Salatin may refer to:

- Salatyn Asgarova, Azerbaijani journalist
- Joel Salatin, American author
- Salatın, village in Azerbaijan
- Salatin, Iran, village in Kermanshah Province, Iran
