= Azerbaijan National Aerospace Agency =

National space agency of Azerbaijan

- Azərbaycan Milli Aero Kosmik Agentliyi

Agency overview
- Abbreviation: MAKA
- Formed: 1992
- Type: Space agency
- Jurisdiction: Azerbaijan
- Headquarters: Baku, Azerbaijan
- Administrator: Natiq Cavadov

Azerbaijan National Aerospace Agency (MAKA; Azerbaijani: Azərbaycan Milli Aerokosmik Agentliyi) is a governmental body that coordinates all Azerbaijani space research programs with scientific and commercial goals. The National Aerospace Agency has been operating as a "Kaspiy" Scientific Center within the National Academy of Sciences of Azerbaijan since 1974, and the Space Exploration Scientific Production Association (CTEB) was established based on the "Kaspiy" Scientific Center in 1981. The Azerbaijan National Aerospace Agency was established in 1992 by Decree No. 580 of Azerbaijani President in place of the Kaspiy Scientific Research Center of the National Academy of Sciences of Azerbaijan.

== History ==
The Azerbaijani space programme is mostly carried out through international cooperation, as during the Soviet era, a few Azerbaijani plants produced equipment for the Soviet Union’s space projects, but their facilities are now out-of-date. The program has included a sequence of satellite missions, both national ones and in cooperation with other nations.

In 2006, the agency transferred to Ministry of Defence Industry of Azerbaijan. In 2009, the Azerbaijani space industry boosted as a new agency was set up under the state program for the development of the space industry after Ilham Aliyev's approval. As part of the program, by 2013, it is planned to make proposals for the in-country assembly and production of VSAT (Very Small Aperture Satellite Terminal). A small earth station for satellite transmission that handles up to 56 kbit/s of digital transmission. VSATs that handle the T1 data rate (up to 1.544 Mbit/s) are called "TSATs. and parts of other terminal stations, satellite receivers of different types and functions (internet, direct TV, GPS, etc.) in order to create the space industry.

On 30 June 2014, MAKA, with cooperation from Airbus launched SPOT 7 Earth observation satellite. They form a constellation of Earth-imaging satellites designed to provide continuity of high-resolution, wide-swath data up to 2024.

== Missions and projects ==
- Azerspace-1, with Azercosmos (launched February 7, 2013; operated by Azercosmos)
- SPOT 7 (launched June 30, 2014)
- Azerspace-2, with Azercosmos (launched September 25, 2018; operated by Azercosmos)

== Organizations included ==
- Institute for Space Research of Natural Resources
- Research Institute of Aerospace Information
- Institute of Ecology
- Space Instrument Engineering Experimental Plant
- Special Design Bureau of Instrument Engineering
- Special Design -Technological Bureau (Lenkoran city)

== See also ==
- List of government space agencies
- Azercosmos
- Shamakhi Astrophysical Observatory
