= Sir Kaneh =

Sir Kaneh or Sirkaneh (Persian: سيركنه) may refer to:

- Sir Kaneh, Ilam
- Sir Kaneh, Kermanshah
- Sirkaneh, Lorestan Province
