= Azersky =

Azerbaijani satellite

- Names: SPOT 7
- Mission type: High-resolution earth observation satellite
- Operator: Azercosmos
- COSPAR ID: 2014-034A
- SATCAT no.: 40053

Spacecraft properties
- Manufacturer: Airbus Defence and Space

Start of mission
- Launch date: 30 June 2014
- Rocket: Polar Satellite Launch Vehicle
- Launch site: Satish Dhawan Space Centre, India

End of mission
- Declared: 20 April 2023

Azersky was an Earth observation satellite with a high-resolution of 1.5 m. It was Azerbaijan's first Earth observation satellite. It was launched into orbit in June 2014.

The satellite was originally named SPOT 7 and developed by Airbus Defence and Space as a part of their SPOT series. SPOT 7 was successfully handed over to Azercosmos on December 2, 2014, and renamed as Azersky. The satellite ceased operations in April 2023.

== Details ==
The satellite had a predicted lifespan 12 years.

The wide application areas of Azersky satellite include defense, security, emergency situations, exploration of natural resources, maritime, environmental protection, urbanization, mapping, agriculture, tourism and others.

It had a resolution of 1.5 m for Panchromatic and 6 m for Multispectral. It had 1 Panchromatic and 4 Multispectral bands (green, blue, red, near-infrared). The image scene had a minimum 60X60 km and a maximum 60X600 km. It orbits at an altitude of 694.9 km. The revisit is 2 days (45°). It is at an inclination of 98.2° (Sun-synchronous).

== Launch and operation ==
The agreement between Azerbaijan and France was signed at the 20th Anniversary Azerbaijan International Telecommunications and Information Technologies Exhibition and Conference, Bakutel 2014 with the participation of President of the Republic of Azerbaijan Ilham Aliyev. By obtaining the first symbolic image from Azersky satellite, the President launched the commercial activity of the satellite. According to the agreement signed between the two parties, Azersky belonging to Azercosmos and SPOT 6 belonging to Airbus Defence and Space will be used in the form of satellite collection.

== End of mission ==
In April 2023, communication with the satellite was lost. Chinese intelligence services could be involved in this incident.

== See also ==
- Azerspace-1, Azerbaijan's first satellite (a telecommunications satellite)
- Azerspace-2, Azerbaijan's third satellite (a telecommunication satellite)
- Azercosmos, first and only satellite operator in South Caucasus region that operates Azerspace-1, Azerspace-2, and Azersky
