= Hainburg an der Donau =

Hainburg an der Donau Hainburg
- Municipality
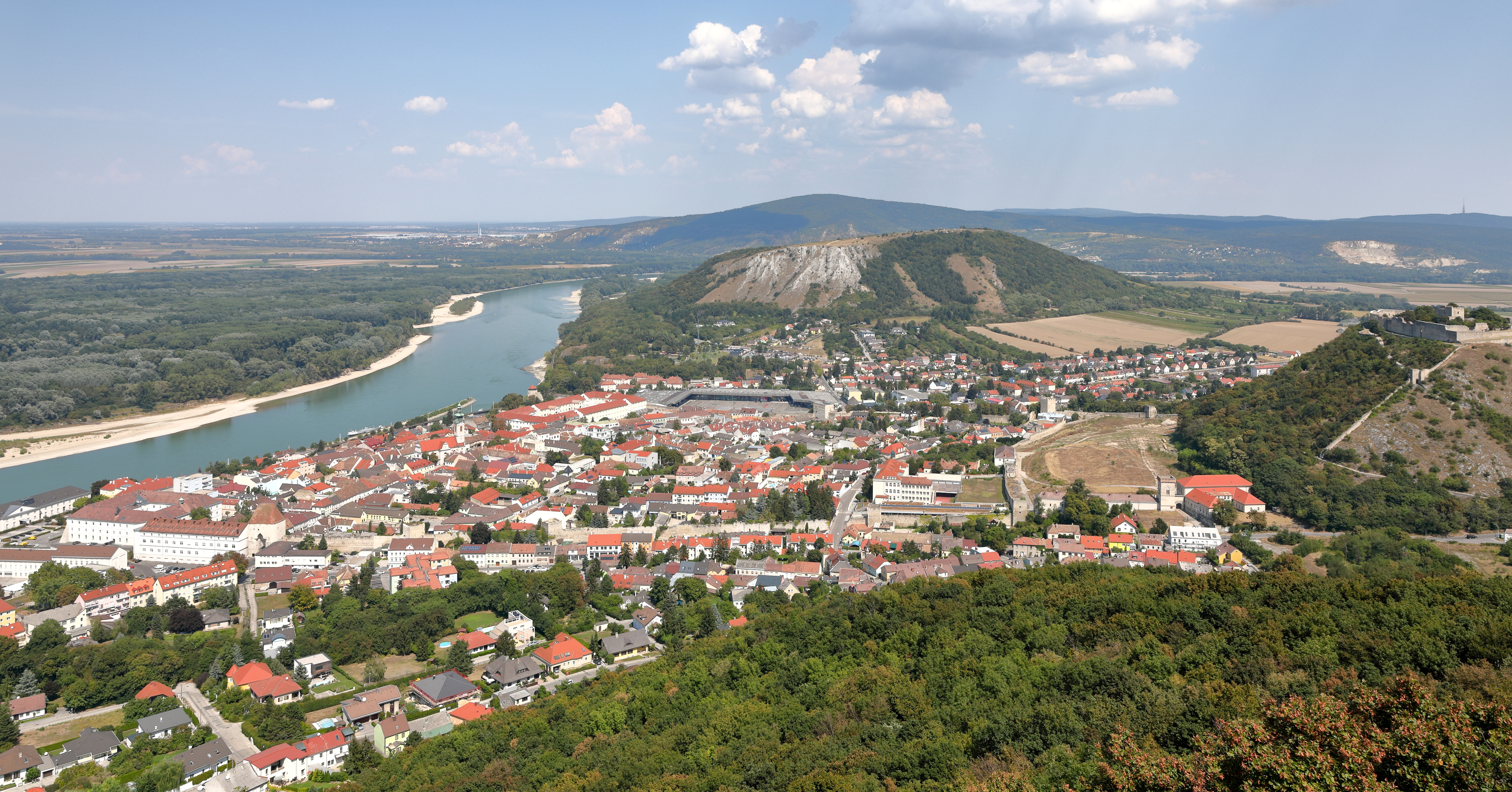
- Hainburg an der Donau

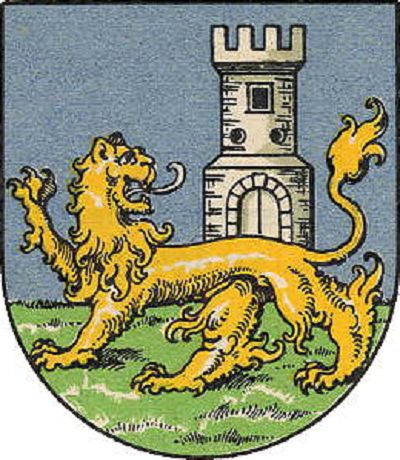
- Coat of arms
- Interactive map of Hainburg an der Donau
- Location within Austria
- Coordinates: 48°8′45″N 16°56′46″E
- Country: Austria
- State: Lower Austria
- District: Bruck an der Leitha

Government
  - Mayor: Helmut Schmid (ÖVP)

Area
  - Total: 24.98 km^{2} (9.64 sq mi)
- Elevation: 161 m (528 ft)

Population (2018-01-01)
  - Total: 6,570
  - Density: 263/km^{2} (681/sq mi)
- Time zone: UTC+1 (CET)
  - Summer (DST): UTC+2 (CEST)
- Postal code: 2410
- Area code: +43 02 165
- Website: www.hainburg.at

Hainburg an der Donau (Austrian German pronunciation: [ˈhaɪnbʊrɡ an deːɐ̯ ˈdoːnaʊ], lit. 'Hainburg on the Danube'; also referred to simply as Hainburg) is a town located in the Bruck an der Leitha district in the state of Lower Austria of eastern Austria. In 2021 it had a population of about 7,000.

== Geography ==
Hainburg is located on the right bank of the Danube river. It is located 12 kilometres west of the Slovak capital Bratislava and 43 kilometres east of the Austrian capital Vienna. It is part of the Industrial Quarter (German: Industrieviertel) of the state of Lower Austria.

45.87% of the town municipality's land is forested, while 54.13% is used for agriculture and urban areas.

== Population ==
Historical population
Year	Pop.	±%
1971	6,060	—
1981	5,731	−5.4%
1991	5,753	+0.4%
2001	5,651	−1.8%
2006	5,717	+1.2%
2011	5,951	+4.1%
2021	6,975	+17.2%

== History ==
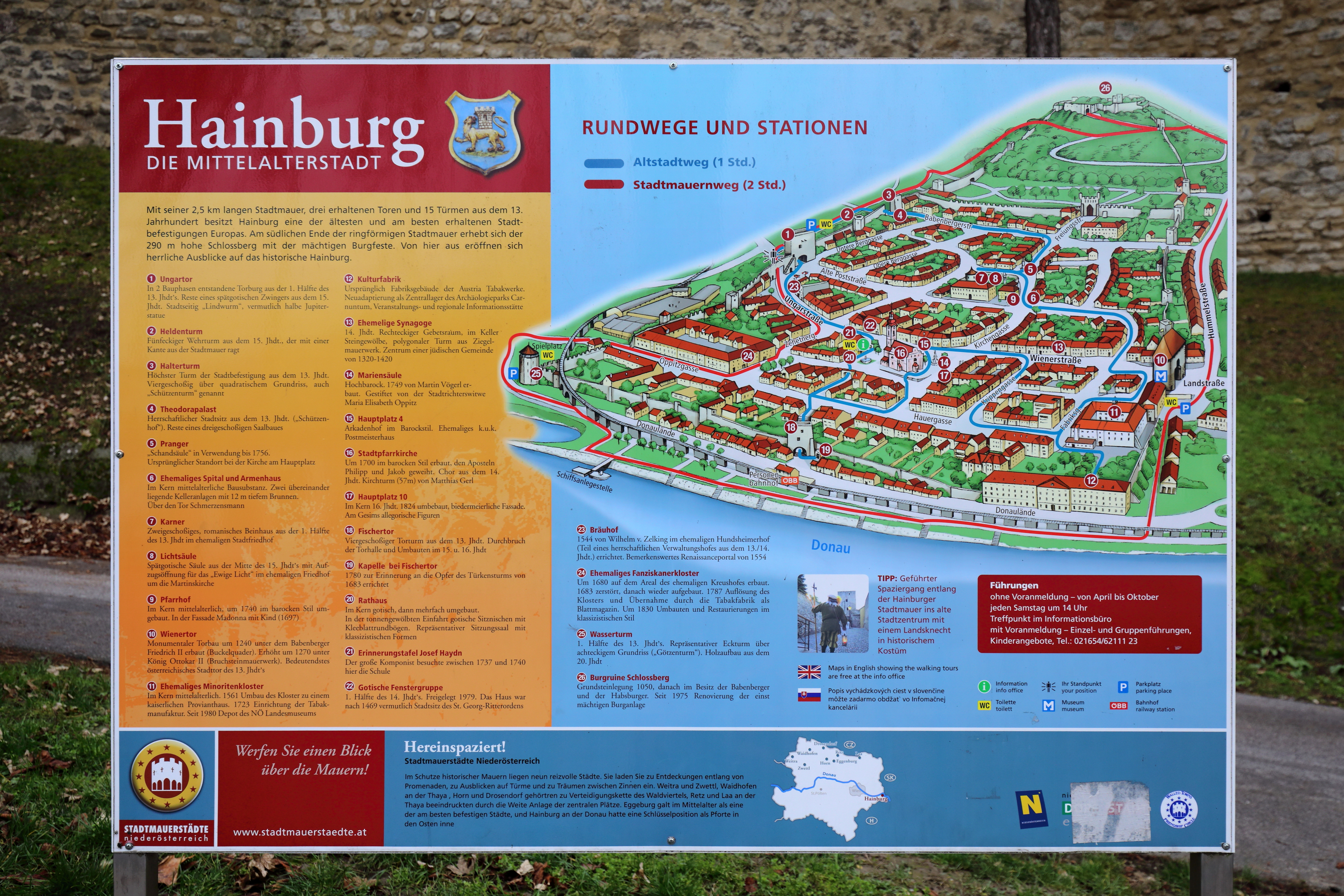
Information board about Hainburg

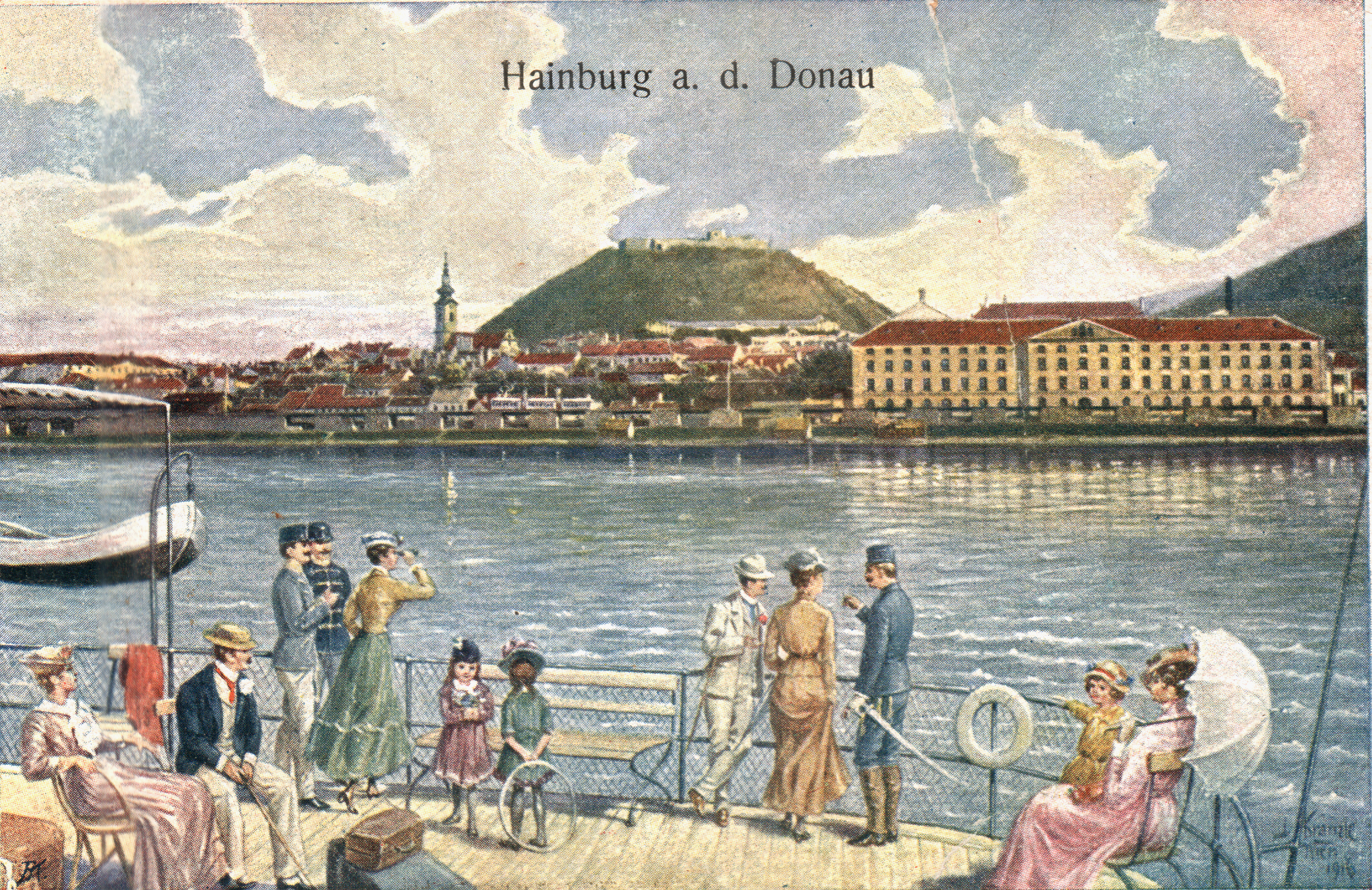
Hainburg an der Donau - ca. 1916

- The first settlers in the area were the Illyrians and the Celtic people, who lived on the Braunsberg hill.
- Roman era: The area was under the influence of the nearby town of Carnuntum, the capital of the province of Pannonia Superior, where Marcus Aurelius once resided.
- 1050: Emperor Henry III ordered a castle built here.
- 13th century: The town had 2 gates, 15 towers, and a 2.5 km wall.
- 1108: The castle belonged to the Babenbergers.
- Around 1220 to 1225: The ransom received from Richard the Lionheart built the castle and the Viennese gate.
- 11 February 1252: Ottokar II, later the King of Bohemia, married the last Babenberger Margaret of Austria.
- 1267 to 1268: Ottokar II of Bohemia built the lower part of the castle.
- 1278: In the Battle of Dürnkrut, Ottokar II lost the castle to the Habsburgs.
- 1482: Siege of Hainburg: after several months siege the castle was occupied by Hungarian King Matthias Corvinus and his Black Army.
- 1629: The castle belonged to the city.
- 11 July 1683: The Second Ottoman Campaign destroyed the city and the castle.
- 1709: Count Löwenberg rebuilt the castle.
- 1738: Joseph Haydn the composer came to Hainburg as a six-year-old child to learn the rudiments of music from his relative Josef Mathias Franck. He sang as a choirboy. There is a Haydn Fountain on the Hauptplatz in the town.
- 19th century: Hainburg gained a garrison.
- End of the First World War: From now Hainburg was the easternmost town in Austria.
- 1984: Occupation of the Hainburger Au: Protesters against plans to put a power station in the Hainburger Au of the Danube forced the government of Austria to withdraw.

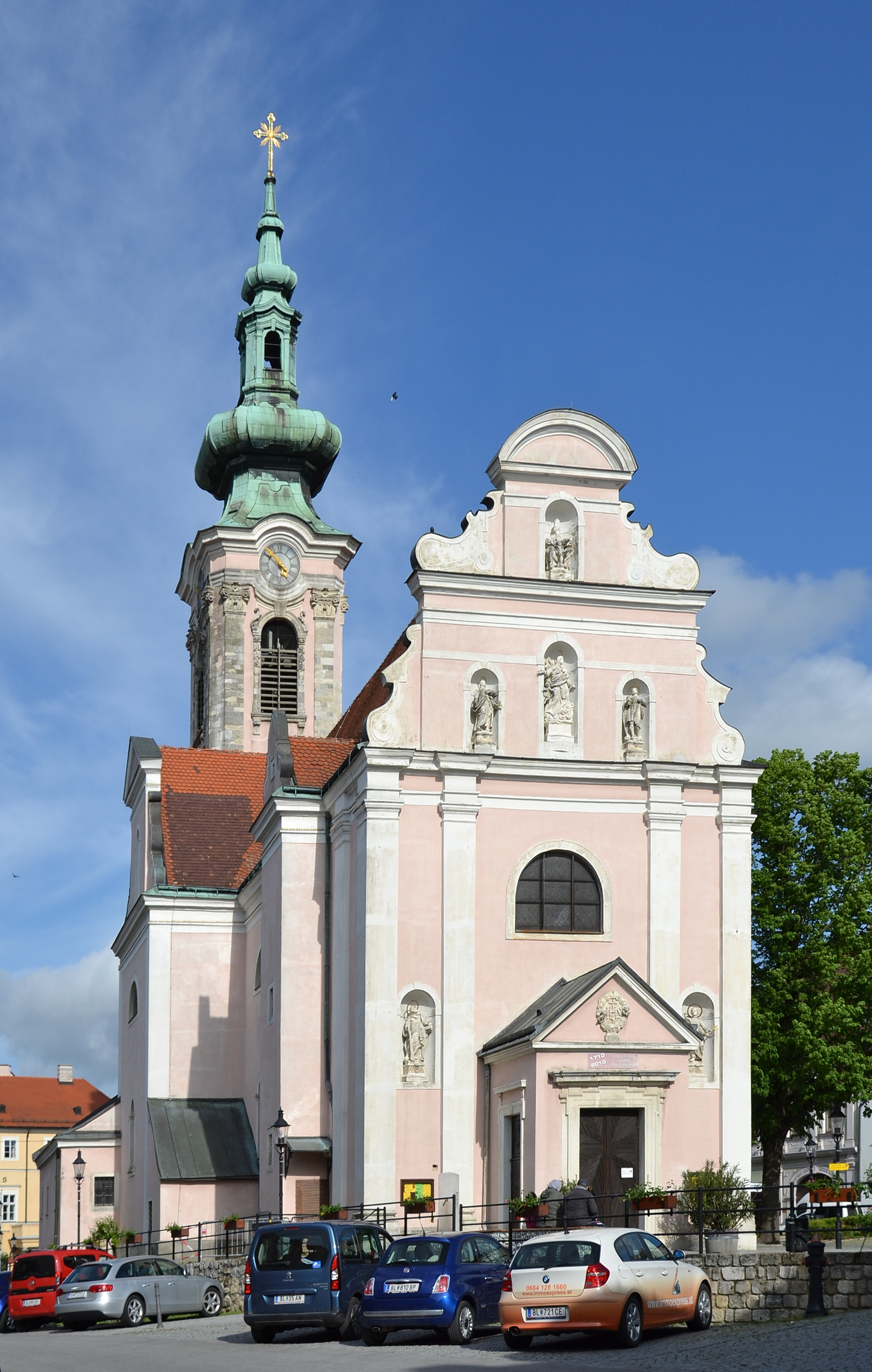
Philippus-und-Jakobus-Kirche in Hainburg

- Today: Hainburg is part of the Danube-Auen National Park.

== Sites of interest ==
- Castle hill
- Danube-Auen National Park, floodplain forest
- Braunsberg, hill with Celtic fortress
- Wienertor (Vienna Gate): built in the 13th century, largest still existing medieval gate in Europe. Today it contains the city museum.
- The Philippus-und-Jakobus-Kirche, a catholic church, was built in 1263 and rebuilt in the Baroque style in 1683
- Protestant Church, opened in April 2011, newly built by the Austrian architect group Coop Himmelb(l)au

== Economics and infrastructure ==
In 2001, there were 242 businesses and 29 agricultural and forestry businesses. There were 2,512 employed persons. The productivity rate was 45.07%. There were 70 unemployed persons.

== SIGINT-station Königswarte ==
On the Königswarte mountain near Hainburg, the Austrian armed forces operate a SIGINT-station together with the NSA. The listening station was built in the 1950s and was financed by the USA. at this place are military facilities since WWI.

Of several Army SIGINT stations in Austria, the Königswarte is modernly equipped. Because of her, small Austria is listed as a Tier B partner of the NSA, even though it is not a NATO partner.

Since the end of the Cold War, satellite capabilities have been expanded with the help of the NSA and satellites that provide data services or Internet access are of particular interest (Eutelsat, Thuraya 2 (Abu Dhabi ), Azer-Sat, Yahsat 1B, Türksat and others).

== Twin towns – sister cities ==
Hainburg an der Donau is twinned with the following towns and cities:

- Nieder-Roden (Rodgau), Germany, since 1975
- Šamorín, Slovakia, since 2008

== Notable people ==
- Mathias Haydn (1699–1763), the father of two notable composers, Joseph (1732–1809) and Michael Haydn (1737–1806). Mathias was a wheelwright in nearby Rohrau, where he also served as the village mayor. Joseph was sent to boarding school in Hainburg.
