= Elshan =

Elshan is both a given name and a surname. Notable people with the name include:

- Elshan Abdullayev (born 1993), Azerbaijani footballer
- Elshan Gambarov (born 1972), Azerbaijani footballer
- Elshan Hajizadeh (born 1961), Azerbaijani professor
- Elshan Huseynov (born 1977), Azerbaijani powerlifter
- Elshan Mamedov (born 1980), Azerbaijani footballer
- Elshan Moradi (born 1985), Iranian-American chess grandmaster
- Elshan Rzazade (born 1993), Azerbaijani footballer
- Leon Elshan (born 2004), Luxembourger footballer
