= Hajizadeh =

Hajizadeh is a surname. Notable people with the surname include:

- Abolfazl Hajizadeh (born 1985), Iranian footballer
- Adnan Hajizadeh (born 1983), Azerbaijani blogger
- Amir Ali Hajizadeh (1962–2025), Iranian general
- Elshan Hajizadeh (born 1961), Azerbaijani economist
- Hamid Hajizadeh (1950–1998), Iranian poet
- Mehdi Hajizadeh (born 1981), Iranian sport wrestler
