= Bahram Aliyev =

Russian scientist (born 1955)

Bahram Aliyev Bəhram Əliyev
- Born: 2 September 1955; Zangibasar District, Armenian SSR, USSR
- Education: Azerbaijan University of Architecture and Construction

Aliyev Bahram Huseyn oghlu (Azerbaijani: Əliyev Bəhram Hüseyn oğlu, born 2 September 1955) is the full member of the Russian Academy of Sciences, and meliorator scientist. He also served as the deputy minister of agriculture (2005-2013), director of the Ecology Institute at the Ministry of Defence Industry of Azerbaijan and Azerbaijan National Aerospace Agency (MAKA).

== Biography ==
Bahram Aliyev was born on 2 September 1955 in Zangibasar district of the Armenian SSR. In 1973, he started his work and scientific activity as a laboratory technician at the Baku branch of "VODGEO". In 1979, he graduated from the full course of the hydromelioration faculty of the Azerbaijan Institute of Civil Engineers, majoring in "engineer – hydraulic technician".

In 1988, he successfully defended his candidate's thesis in the city of Novocherkassk and received the degree of candidate of technical sciences in the specialty "Melioration and irrigation agriculture". During his scientific creative activity, he created more than 30 different constructions, systems of irrigation equipment and progressive irrigation methods of agricultural plants. In 1995, he successfully defended his doctoral dissertation in "Gruzvodecology" and received the degree of Doctor of Technical Sciences in the specialty "Hydrotechnical Reclamation" In 1997, he submitted his dissertation to the Academy of Sciences of the Republic of Azerbaijan, successfully defended it again and received the degree of Doctor of Technical Sciences in the specialty "Melioration and irrigation agriculture".

In 1997, he was elected a full member of the International Academy of Ecology and Nature Use. In 1999, he was elected a corresponding member of the International Academy of Engineers. In 2001, he was elected academician of the Russian Academy of Water Management Sciences. In 2010, he was elected a full member of the Russian Academy of Agriculture.
