= Spot Image =

French satellite company under Airbus

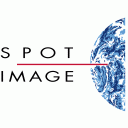
- Type: Subsidiary
- Genre: Satellite Products and Services Provider
- Founded: 1982; 44 years ago
- Headquarters: Toulouse, France
- Key people: Hervé Buchwalter (CEO)
- Net income: 94 800 K€ (2007)
- Number of employees: 244
- Parent: Airbus Defence and Space
- Website: www.astrium-geo.com

Spot Image, a public limited company created in 1982 by the French Space Agency, Centre National d'Etudes Spatiales (CNES), the IGN, and Space Manufacturers (Matra, Alcatel, SSC, etc.) is a subsidiary of Airbus Defence and Space (99%). The company is the commercial operator for the SPOT Earth observation satellites.

== Network and partners ==
Spot Image is a worldwide distributor of products and services using imagery from Earth observation satellites and works through a network of subsidiaries, local offices (Australia, Brazil, China, United States, Japan, Peru, Singapore), and partners. The goal is to provide on-the-spot service with worldwide availability.

Spot Image works with a network of more than 30 direct receiving stations handling images acquired by the SPOT satellites.

Spot Image collaborates with EU's GMES/Copernicus programme, shares geographic information with the OGC and contributes to the interoperability of web services; with Infoterra Global it continues to offer services for precision-agriculture.

== Satellites ==
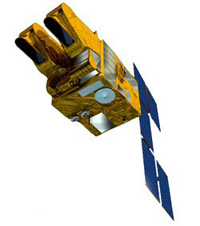
SPOT 5 Satellite

The 3 SPOT satellites in orbit (Spot 5, 6, and 7) provide images with a large choice of resolutions – from 2.5 m to 10 m. Spot Image also distributes multiresolution data from other optical satellites, in particular from Formosat-2 (Taiwan) and Kompsat-2 (South Korea), for which it has exclusive distribution rights, and from radar satellites (TerraSAR-X, ERS, Envisat, Radarsat). Spot Image is also the exclusive distributor of data from the very-high resolution Pleiades satellites. The launch of Pléiades-1, via a Soyuz rocket, was confirmed on December 16, 2011. The second (Pléiades-2) was launched mid-2012. Spot Image also offers infrastructures for receiving and processing, as well as added value options.

== Products ==
In addition to images, Spot Image proposes innovative added-value products to meet new user-needs:

- ortho-images (SPOTView ortho) whose location accuracy is less than 10 m RMS
- homogeneous territorial coverage, orthorectified (SPOTMaps), which come in natural colours with 2.5 m resolution
- 3D products (SPOT DEM) built from automatic correlation of stereoscopic pairs acquired by SPOT 5's HRS (Haute Résolution Stéréoscopique, High Resolution Stereoscopic) instrument

Among the services offered by Spot File:

- Programming of SPOT satellites: direct-access satellite programming and regular revisit capability over the same point on the globe enable the acquisition of images over a selected area of interest.
- The SPOT archives: more than 18 million images of the whole world, collected by SPOT satellites since 1986, are archived and accessible on line, offering recent or historical geographic information.

On-line services:

- SPOTGallery giving the general public access to images chosen for aesthetic, cultural or thematic reasons,
- In partnership with Google Earth, ’One World, One Year‘ offers the best images from the SPOT satellites whose acquisition data is not more than one year old, for almost the entire planet.

== Planet Action, an initiative launched by Spot Image ==
Its goal is to encourage the Earth observation industry and geographic information professionals to support local projects searching for adaptive solutions to climate change problems. The products and materials available to these professionals – satellite images, geographic information systems, image processing and display software – are indispensable for studying the impact of global warming on our planet, on local and global scales. Planet Action supports projects that study:

- the impact on populations and habitat
- droughts, desertification and water resources
- vegetation, biodiversity and ecosystems,
- the oceans
- ice, glaciers and snow cover

Planet Action Web Site

== Important dates ==
Headquarters of Spot Image in Toulouse

- 1982: Creation of Spot Image in Toulouse, France
- 1983: Creation of Spot Image Corporation in the United States
- 1986: Launch of the SPOT 1 satellite
- 1990: Creation of Spot Imaging Services in Australia
- 1990: Launch of the SPOT 2 satellite
- 1991: Creation of Spot Asia in Singapore
- 1998: Creation of Beijing Spot Image in China
- 1998: Launch of SPOT 4
- 2002: Creation of Tokyo Spot Image
- 2002: Launch of SPOT 5
- 2004: Opening of offices in Brazil and Mexico
- 2004: Signing of a contract with the NSPO for the distribution of data from the Formosat-2 satellite
- 2005: Signing of a contract with KARI for the distribution of data from the Kompsat-2 satellite
- 2006: Opening of an office in Peru
- 2008: Spot Image is 81% owned by Astrium Services, an EADS company
- 2008: Spot Image Brasil replaces the office opened in this country
- 2012 : Launch of SPOT 6
- 2014 : Launch of SPOT 7

== See also ==
- SPOT (satellites)
- CNES
- EADS
