= Braunsberg (hill) =

Limestone massif in Austria

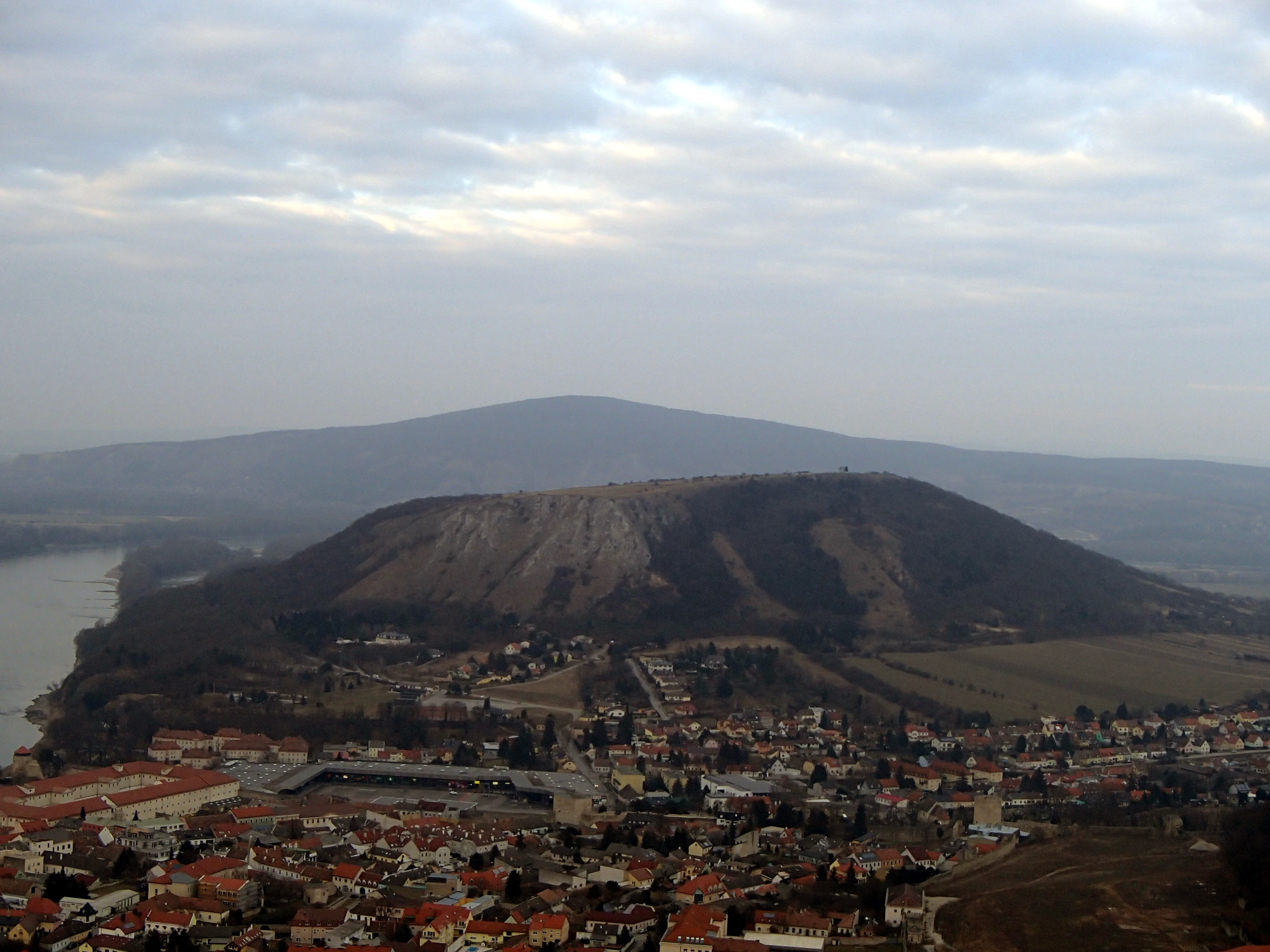
- Braunsberg and Hainburg

Highest point
- Elevation: 346 m (1,135 ft)
- Coordinates: 48°09′13″N 16°57′24″E

Geography
- Location: Hainburg, Austria
- Parent range: Little Carpathians

Braunsberg is a 346 m high limestone massif in Hainburg an der Donau, Austria, on the shore of the Danube. Its plateau used to host a Celtic town, and still bears traces of the Celtic-Roman era.
