= Salatın =

Village in the Shusha District of Azerbaijan

Salatın is a village in the Shusha District of Azerbaijan. The village was the site of martyred journalist Salatyn Asgarova on the 9th of January 1991. Salatyn was covering the First Nagorno-Karabakh War. Afterwords, the village, and a street in Baku were renamed to Salatin in her honor.
