= Azercosmos =

Space Agency of Azerbaijan

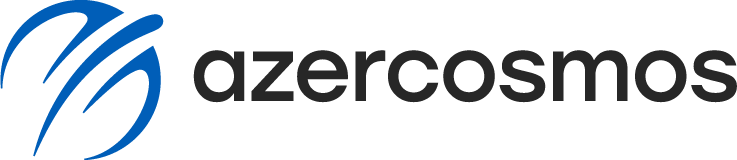
- Type: Space Agency
- Industry: Satellite operations
- Founded: May 3, 2010; 16 years ago
- Headquarters: Baku, Azerbaijan
- Key people: Dunay Badirkhanov (chair (a/g))
- Services: Communication services, Earth observation
- Owner: Government of Azerbaijan
- Number of employees: 200 (2024)
- Parent: AZCON Holding
- Website: azercosmos.az

Space Agency of the Republic of Azerbaijan (Azercosmos) (Azerbaijani: Azərbaycan Respublikasının Kosmik Agentliyi - Azərkosmos) is a public legal entity under Azerbaijan Transport and Communication Holding (AZCON Holding) and successor of Azercosmos Open Joint Stock Company, the first satellite operator in the Caucasus region entirely owned by the Government of Azerbaijan. With the telecommunication satellite Azerspace-1, the company provides broadband and broadcast services to customers in Europe, Africa, the Middle East, the Caucasus, and Central Asia. With the Earth Observation satellite Azersky, Azercosmos provides satellite imagery and geoinformation services.

== History ==
During a meeting of the Cabinet of Ministers in 2008, President Ilham Aliyev gave a task on "establishment of a modern aerospace industry in Azerbaijan and launch of country’s telecommunication satellite into orbit". Implementation of the task was assigned to the Ministry of Communication and High Technologies.

To realize the project, the Ministry applied to the International Telecommunication Union for the orbital slot allocation process. Concurrently, in August 2009, President Aliyev signed a decree on approval of a state program to establish and develop the space industry in Azerbaijan. In May 2010, the Ministry of Communication and High Technologies reached an agreement with Measat Satellite Systems of Malaysia to lease the geostationary position at the 46° East orbital slot, which belongs to the Malaysian government. As a result of the tenders announced on manufacturing and launch of the first Azerbaijani telecommunication satellite, US-based Orbital Sciences Corporation was chosen to construct the satellite, and French company Arianespace was selected to launch it.

On May 3, 2010, Presidential Decree ref. 885 established Azercosmos OJSCo with the purpose of implementing the launch, operation, and exploitation of telecommunication satellites for the Republic of Azerbaijan. In October 2017, Azercosmos OJSCo was moved out from under the Ministry of Transport, Communication and High Technologies, and became accountable directly to the Cabinet of Ministers.

In October 2023, Azerbaijan signed up to China’s international moon base project, ILRS.

In May 2026 the Azercosmos has become a member of the international Digital Intermediate Frequency Interoperability Consortium.

== Satellites ==
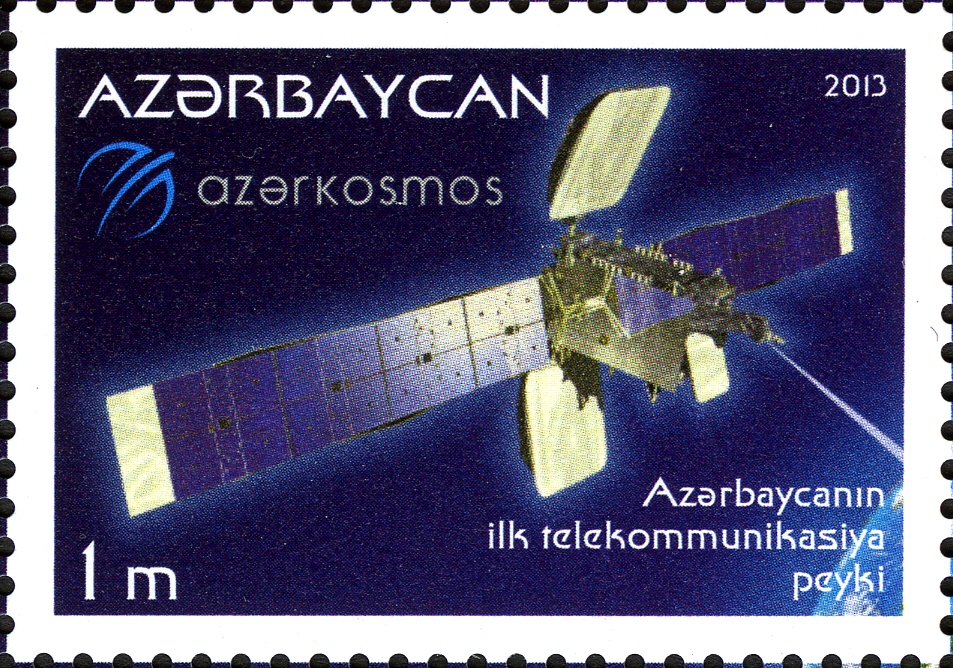
Azerspace-1 on the stamp of Azerbaijan, 2013

- Azerspace-1 – telecommunication satellite; provides radio and television broadcast services, encrypted communication, and high-speed data transmission. The satellite covers Europe, Africa, the Middle East, Central Asia and the Caucasus. It was launched in February 2013 and is equipped with 36 transponders: 24 in C-band and 12 in Ku-band. It is located at 46° East longitude. The anticipated lifespan of Azerspace-1 is 15 years.
- Azerspace-2 – telecommunication satellite; was launched on September 25, 2018; to provide broadband and broadcast services to customers in Europe, the Middle East, Sub-Saharan Africa, and Central and South Asia. The satellite is planned to be equipped with 35 transponders in Ku-band, and will be located at 45° East longitude. The lifespan of Azerspace-2 is expected to be 15 years.
- Azersky – Earth Observation Satellite. In December 2014, Azercosmos took over the rights to operate and commercialize Azersky, a high resolution (1.5 metres (4.9 ft) black and white and 6 metres (20 ft) color) optical Earth observation satellite. The imaging swath width of Azersky is 60 by 60 kilometres (37 mi × 37 mi); the maximum is 60 by 600 kilometres (37 mi × 373 mi).

== Services ==
Azercosmos operates a teleport in Baku, which receives signals via intermediary satellites, metronet, and fiber. This teleport enables uplink services, data distribution, and internet connectivity.

== See also ==
- Azerbaijan National Aerospace Agency
- Azerspace-1/Africasat-1a
- Azerbaijan's space program
