= SPOT (satellite) =

Commercial Earth-imaging satellite system operated by the French space agency CNES

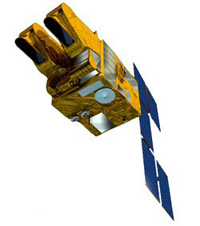
Spot-5 Satellite

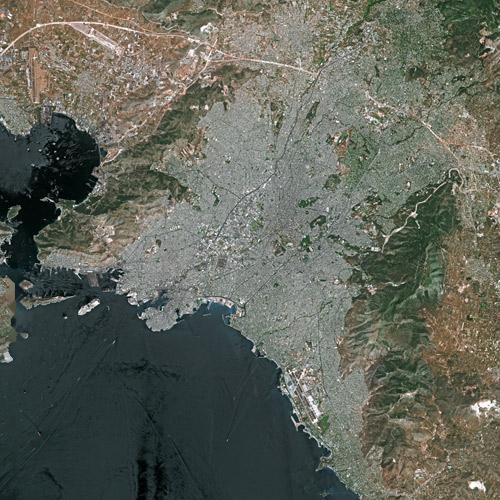
Athens as seen by the SPOT 5 satellite in 2002

SPOT (French: Satellite Pour l’Observation de la Terre, lit. "Satellite for observation of Earth") is a commercial high-resolution optical Earth observation satellite system operating from space. It is run by Spot Image, based in Toulouse, France. It was initiated by the CNES (Centre national d'études spatiales – the French space agency) in the 1970s and was developed in association with the SSTC (Belgian scientific, technical and cultural services) and the Swedish National Space Board (SNSB). It has been designed to improve the knowledge and management of the Earth by exploring the Earth's resources, detecting and forecasting phenomena involving climatology and oceanography, and monitoring human activities and natural phenomena. The SPOT system includes a series of satellites and ground control resources for satellite control and programming, image production, and distribution. Earlier satellites were launched using the European Space Agency's Ariane 2, 3, and 4 rockets, while SPOT 6 and SPOT 7 were launched by the Indian PSLV.

== List of satellites ==
SPOT Image is marketing the high-resolution images, which SPOT can take from every corner of the Earth.

- SPOT 1 launched February 22, 1986 with 10 panchromatic and 20 meter multispectral picture resolution capability. Withdrawn December 31, 1990.
- SPOT 2 launched January 22, 1990 and deorbited in July 2009.
- SPOT 3 launched September 26, 1993. Stopped functioning November 14, 1997.
- SPOT 4 launched March 24, 1998. Stopped functioning July, 2013, orbit lowering was performed.
- SPOT 5 launched May 4, 2002 with 2.5 m, 5 m and 10 m capability. Decommissioned in March 31, 2015, then orbit lowering was performed.
- SPOT 6 launched September 9, 2012.
- SPOT 7 (Azersky) launched on June 30, 2014. Stopped functioning March 17, 2023.

== Orbit ==
The SPOT orbit is polar, circular, Sun-synchronous, and phased. The inclination of the orbital plane combined with the rotation of the Earth around the polar axis allows the satellite to fly over any point on Earth within 26 days. The orbit has an altitude of 832 kilometers (517 mi), an inclination of 98.7°, and completing 14 + 5/26 revolutions per day.

== Generations ==
=== SPOT 1, 2, and 3 ===
Since 1986 the SPOT family of satellites has been orbiting the Earth and has already taken more than 10 million high quality images. SPOT 1 was launched with the last Ariane 1 rocket on February 22, 1986. Two days later, the 1,800 kg (4,000 lb) SPOT 1 transmitted its first image with a spatial resolution of 10 or 20 meters (33 or 66 ft). SPOT 2 joined SPOT 1 in orbit on January 22, 1990, on the Ariane 4 maiden flight, and SPOT 3 followed on September 26, 1993, also on an Ariane 4.

The satellite loads were identical, each including two identical HRV (High Resolution Visible) imaging instruments that were able to operate in two modes, either simultaneously or individually. The two spectral modes are panchromatic and multispectral. The panchromatic band has a resolution of 10 meters (33 ft), and the three multispectral bands (G, R, NIR) have resolutions of 20 meters (66 ft)s. They have a scene size of 3,600 km^{2} (1,400 sq mi) and a revisit interval of one to four days, depending on the latitude.

Because the orbit of SPOT 1 was lowered in 2003, it will gradually lose altitude and break up naturally in the atmosphere. Deorbiting of SPOT 2, in accordance with Inter-Agency Space Debris Coordination Committee (IADC), commenced in mid-July 2009 for a period of two weeks, with a final burn on 29 July 2009. SPOT 3 is no longer functioning, due to problems with its stabilization system.

=== SPOT 4 ===
SPOT 4 launched March 24, 1998 and stopped functioning July, 2013. In 2013, CNES lowered the altitude of SPOT 4 by 2.5 km (1.6 mi) to put it on a phased orbit with a five-day repeat cycle. On this orbit, SPOT4 was programmed to acquire a time-lapse series of images over 42 sites with a five days revisit period from February to end of May 2013. The data set it produced is aimed at helping future users of the Sentinel-2 mission to learn working with time-lapse series. The time-lapse series provided by SPOT4 (Take5) have the same repetitiveness as those that will be delivered by the Sentinel-2 satellites, starting in 2015 and 2016.

=== SPOT 5 ===
SPOT 5 was launched on May 4, 2002, and has the goal to ensure continuity of services for customers and to improve the quality of data and images by anticipating changes in market requirements.

SPOT 5 has two high resolution geometrical (HRG) instruments that were deduced from the HRVIR of SPOT 4. They offer a higher resolution of 2.5 to 5 meters in panchromatic mode and 10 meters in multispectral mode (20 metre on short wave infrared 1.58 – 1.75 μm). SPOT 5 also features an HRS imaging instrument operating in panchromatic mode. HRS points forward and backward of the satellite. Thus, it is able to take stereopair images almost simultaneously to map relief.

=== SPOT 6 and SPOT 7 ===
SPOT 6 was launched by India's Polar Satellite Launch Vehicle on flight C21 at 04:23 UTC on 9 September 2012, while SPOT 7 was launched on PSLV flight C23 at 04:42 UTC on 30 June 2014. They form a constellation of Earth-imaging satellites designed to provide continuity of high-resolution, wide-swath data up to 2024. EADS Astrium decided to build this constellation in 2009 on the basis of a perceived government need for this kind of data. Spot Image, a subsidiary of Astrium, funded the satellites alone and owned the system (satellites and ground segments) at time of launch. In December 2014, SPOT 7 was sold to Azerbaijan's space agency Azercosmos, who renamed it Azersky.

- The architecture is similar to that of the Pleiades satellites, with a centrally mounted optical instrument, a three-axis star tracker, a fiber-optic gyro (FOG) and four control moment gyros (CMGs).
- SPOT 6 and SPOT 7 are phased in the same orbit as Pléiades 1A and Pléiades 1B at an altitude of 694 km (431 mi), forming a constellation of 2-by-2 satellites - 90° apart from one another.
- Image product resolution:
  - Panchromatic: 1.5 m
  - Colour merge: 1.5 m
  - Multi-spectral: 6 m
- Spectral bands, with simultaneous panchromatic and multi-spectral acquisitions:
  - Panchromatic (450 – 745 nm)
  - Blue (450 – 525 nm)
  - Green (530 – 590 nm)
  - Red (625 – 695 nm)
  - Near-infrared (760 – 890 nm)
- Footprint: 60 km × 60 km
- Responsive satellite tasking, with six tasking plans per day, per satellite
- Capacity to acquire up to 3 million km^{2} daily
