= Salatyn Asgarova =

Salatyn Asgarova Salatın Əsgərova
- Born: 16 December 1961; Baku, Azerbaijan SSR
- Died: 9 January 1991 (aged 29); 6th km of Lachin-Shusha highway, next to Boyuk Galadarasi village
- Occupation: Journalist
- Children: Jeyhun Asgarov
- Awards: National Hero of Azerbaijan (posthumously)

Salatyn Aziz qizi Asgarova (also spelled Salatyn Askerova; Azerbaijani: Salatın Əziz qızı Əsgərova; 16 December 1961 – 9 January 1991) was a National Hero of Azerbaijan. Azerbaijani journalist killed in the First Nagorno-Karabakh War.

== Life ==
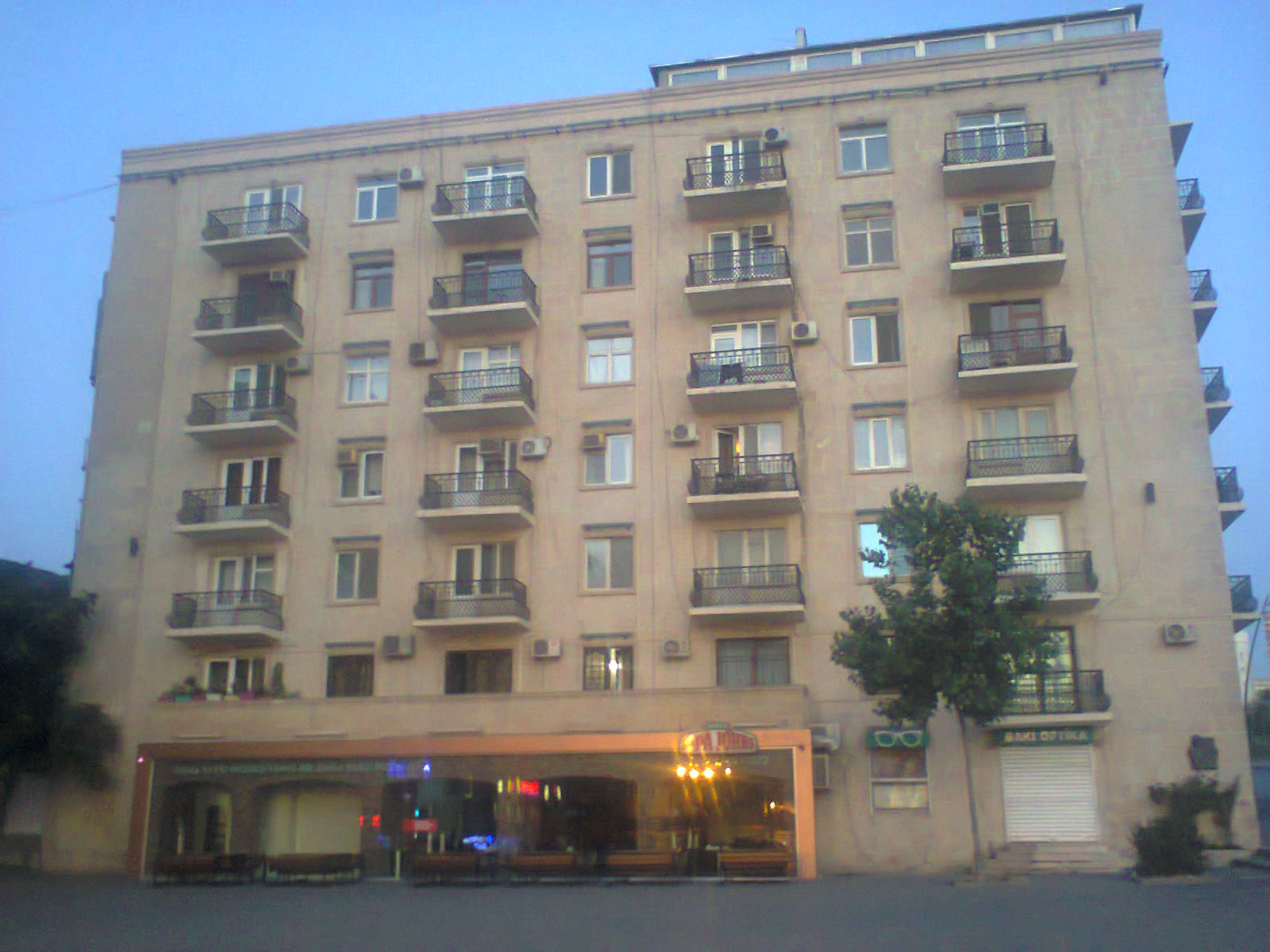
The apartment building in Baku where Asgarova lived

Salatyn Aziz qizi Asgarova was born on 16 December 1961 in Baku, Azerbaijan. After completing secondary school, she entered Azerbaijan Oil and Chemistry Institute. Nevertheless, her enormous interest in literature brought her into journalism. She started her journalistic career at "Baku" newspaper, and then began working as a special correspondent for Molodezh Azerbaijana (The Youth of Azerbaijan). Before the beginning of the First Nagorno-Karabakh War, Salatyn was writing about contemporary issues of society. However, after the war broke out, Salatyn frequently visited the front line and provided press coverage from hot spots. Her family and colleagues tried to persuade her not to go to the front line jeopardizing her life. In such cases, she would usually say: "If nobody goes, then who will?”

=== First Nagorno-Karabakh War ===
On 9 January 1991, the 29-year-old journalist was on her way to Shusha to prepare a story for the newspaper. At the 6th kilometer of the Lachin – Shusha highway, next to the village of Boyuk Galadarasi, the vehicle in which she was traveling was shot upon by Armenian militants firing from at almost point-blank range with machine guns and sniper rifles. The investigators counted 113 bullet holes in the vehicle. As a result of the attack, Salatyn Asgarova died instantly. Three military officers (Lieutenant-Colonel O. Larionov, Major I. Ivanov, and Sergeant I. Goyek) of the Soviet Army accompanying her were killed as well. The attackers – Arno Mkrtchian, Hrachik Petrossian, A. Mongasagian and Garik Arustamian – were identified and arrested. They were later released and handed over to the Armenian authorities.

== Legacy ==
A Baku street and a vessel in the Caspian Sea carry her name.

A monument in her memory was erected at Tafakkur University in Baku.

She has conferred the National Hero title posthumously. Salatyn Asgarova was buried in the Martyrs' Lane in Baku.
