= Sirkaneh =

Sirkaneh سيركانه
- Village
- Location within Iran
- Coordinates: 34°18′41″N 47°48′33″E
- Country: Iran
- Province: Lorestan
- County: Delfan
- Bakhsh: Kakavand
- Rural District: Kakavand-e Sharqi

Population (2006)
  - Total: 75
- Time zone: UTC+3:30 (IRST)
  - Summer (DST): UTC+4:30 (IRDT)

Sirkaneh (Persian: سيركانه, also romanized as Sīrkāneh and Sīrakāneh; also known as Sīrkābeh) is a village in Kakavand-e Sharqi Rural District, Kakavand District, Delfan County, Lorestan Province, Iran. At the 2006 census, its population was 75, in 13 families.
