= Fuad Mamedov =

Azerbaijani academic (born 1946)

- Fuad Məmmədov
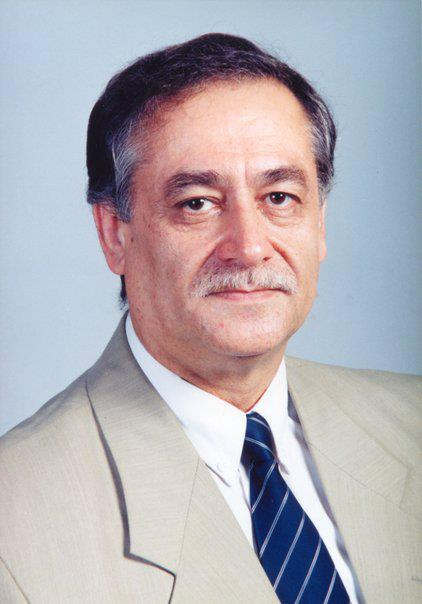
- Born: 28 October 1946 (age 79); Baku, Azerbaijan

Academy of Public Administration under the President of Azerbaijan Republic
- President: Ilham Aliyev

Fuad Mamedov Teyub oglu (Azerbaijani: Fuad Məmmədov Teyyub oğlu) is a professor of culturology and Chair of the History Department at the Academy of Public Administration (Azerbaijan). He is the founder of Culturology in Azerbaijan and also the President of the Cultural Association Simurgh.

== Background and career ==
Fuad Mamedov was born in Baku, Azerbaijan, in 1948. He finished Baku school No. 150 in 1964, and in 1969 Mamedov graduated from Azerbaijan Oil and Chemistry Institute.

1969 to 1991 Mamedov took a position at an institution of the Academy of Sciences of Azerbaijan. In 1991 to 1999 he worked at Baku Institute of Social Management and Political Studies as a professor and Chairman of the Department of History and Cultural Studies. From 1999 through present Mamedov is a history professor at the Academy of State Management Under the President of the Republic of Azerbaijan.

Mamedov is an alumnus of the school of thought of the Institute of History of Science and Technology (USSR Academy of Sciences). He specialized in Azerbaijan history defending his thesis in 1975 and received first Grand PhD in History of Arts and Science in Azerbaijan in 1985.

== Cultural studies in Azerbaijan ==
In 1989 Fuad Mamedov was the first to conduct specific research into cultural studies (history and theory of the world culture and civilization) to achieve valuable scientific results and was instrumental to develop this new field in Azerbaijan.

Mammadov worked in the Institute of History and the History Museum of Azerbaijan (Azerbaijan Academy of Sciences) for over 20 years, starting as a Junior Research Fellow, then Head of the Department of History of Arts and Science and finally Chief Researcher. During this period he organized over 60 exhibitions and presentations, among them exhibitions on the History of Arts and Science of Azerbaijan. As a consequence of his activities over 200 gold, silver and bronze medals and diplomas have found their recipients among academics and academic institutions of Azerbaijan at the Exhibition of Economic Achievements of the USSR and international exhibitions. Mamedov formulated concepts of Museum of History of Arts and Science and Center for History and Theory of Arts and Science.

In 1974 to 1982 Mamedov was engaged in pro bono publico activities as Academic Secretary of the Scientific Board for Exhibitions and Presentations of Findings, Deputy Chairman of the Knowledge Society of the Academy of Sciences of Azerbaijan and as a member of the Contemporary History Task Force of the Academy of Sciences of Azerbaijan.

== Works and opinions ==
Fuad Mamedov has authored and compiled over 200 academic and educational papers including 11 monographs. Among them are:

Cultural Studies, The Problems of Theory and History (Baku, 2002) Cultural Studies as the Means of Efficient Vital Activity (Baku, 2006) Culture of Management, Practice of Foreign Countries (Baku, 2009)

The last book is based on his course, the Culture of Management. The Expertise of Foreign Countries, which he has been taught to students and officials at the Academy of Public Administration (Azerbaijan).

Russian culture academician Alexander Zapesotsky, wrote on Mamedov's monograph on Cultural Management:

"In the scientific sense the monograph appears to me a substantial body of universal cultural knowledge. Due to the original cultural approach to managerial problems, a new form of systematization and description of management processes, a culturologist`s judgment of history, theory and practice of state management in Eastern and Western cultures, your book gains a special academic and practical value. The unique method elaborated by you, called “Cultural Pyramid”, is of particular academic and practical value. It serves to the purpose of continuous improvement to the studies of management and allows generating innovative models of efficient management at various levels."

Other letters, showing the regard that other academicians hold Mamedov have been sent by International Academy of Sciences in Azerbaijan (2007), Russian Academy of Pedagogical and Social Sciences (2007) and the St. Petersburg Branch of the Russian Institute of Cultural Studies (2008).

Mamedov has represented the Azerbaijani science community at international conferences, in societies and embassies of Russia, US, Germany, Norway, France, South Korea, Thailand, Egypt, Greece, Turkey, Iran, Costa Rica, Romania, Hungary and other countries. As a result of his performance in 1991 in Costa Rica, this Central American country was one of the first to officially recognize the independence of Azerbaijan. Following his report On the Scientific Approach To the Formation of Cultural Policy delivered at the International Culturological Conference in Norway (Bergen) in 2000, Mamedov was put on the Council of Europe's list of cultural policy experts.

Mamedov is the Chairman of the Bachelor and Master Diploma Defense State Commission majoring in International Relations at the Azerbaijan University of Economics and a Member of several Dissertation councils of the Academy of State Management Under the President of the Republic of Azerbaijan and the Azerbaijan Academy of Arts. In 1999, on his initiative, the Republican Doctoral and Postgraduate Thesis Examination Council for Cultural Studies was established.

Mamedov is also the president of the "Simurgh" Association of Culture of Azerbaijan, established by the Academy of Sciences of Azerbaijan in 1990; Chairman of the Society of Azerbaijan Cultural Studies; the Founder and Editor in Chief of the "Simurgh" international magazine of culture (history and theory of world culture and civilization), Author and Host of Idrak culturologic TV show.

== Honors ==
- Silver and bronze medals, from the USSR Exhibition of Economic Achievements
- Diploma from the Head Committee of the USSR Exhibition of Economic Achievements
- Diplomas and Badges from the All-Union and Republican Knowledge Societies
- Certificates of Merit from the CPSU Central Committee, USSR Council of Ministers, All-Union Central Trade Union Council and All-Union Leninist Young Communist League
- Golden Feather - Azerbaijan National Public Prizes
- Gold Medal of the Ministry of Education, Egypt
- Simurgh International Medal
