= Nadir Ibrahimov =

Azerbaijani astronomer

Nadir Ibrahimov Azerbaijani: Nadir İbrahimov
- Born: 29 December 1932; Lahij, Azerbaijan
- Died: 1 January 1977 (aged 44); Azerbaijan
- Education: Baku State University
- Known for: Map of Mars (1971), Martian canals, Craters discovered: Ibragimov (Martian crater) (August, 1982)
- Scientific career
- Fields: Astronomy
- Workplaces: Shamakhi Astrophysical Observatory

Nadir Baba oglu Ibrahimov (Azerbaijani: Nadir Baba oğlu İbrahimov; December 29, 1932 – January 1, 1977) was an Azerbaijani and a Soviet astronomer. A crater on Mars is named in his honor.

Nadir Ibragimov was astrophysicist at Shamakhi Astrophysical Observatory of the Azerbaijan National Academy of Sciences.
