= Shamakhy Astrophysical Observatory =

Observatory in Azerbaijan

Nasir al-Din al-Tusi Shamakhy Astrophysical Observatory
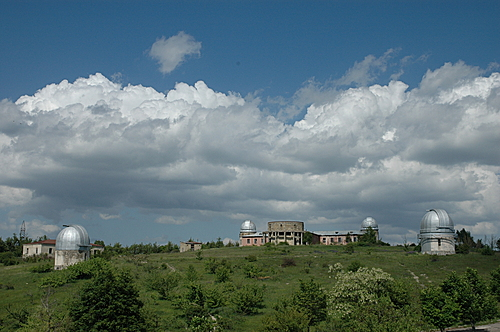
- Panoramic view of the Shamakhy Astrophysical Observatory
- Alternative names: Shamakhi Astrophysical Observatory
- Named after: Nasir al-Din al-Tusi
- Organization: National Academy of Sciences of Azerbaijan
- Location: Shamakhi District, AZE
- Coordinates: 40°46′55″N 48°35′48″E
- Altitude: 1,435 m (4,708 ft)
- Observing time: 200 nights per year
- Established: November 17, 1959
- Website: Shao.az

Telescopes
- 2 m Carl Zeiss Jena: reflector
- 70 cm AZT-8 photoelectric telescope: Cassegrain reflector
- 60 cm Zeiss-600 telescope: Cassegrain reflector
- 35 cm AST-452 meniscus telescope: catadioptric
- Related media on Commons

The Shamakhy Astrophysical Observatory, named after Nasreddin Tusi of the National Academy of Sciences of Azerbaijan (ANAS ShAO; Azerbaijani: Azərbaycan Milli Elmlər Akademiyası Nəsirəddin Tusi adına Şamaxı Astrofizika Rəsədxanası, AMEA ŞAR) was established on November 17, 1959, by decree No. 975 of the Council of Ministers of the Azerbaijan SSR. ShAO operates as a research institute within the ANAS Department of Physical, Mathematical, and Technical Sciences. The Observatory is located in the north-east of the Greater Caucasus Range, 150 km from the city of Baku, in the eastern part of Mount Pirkuli, at an altitude of 1435–1500 m above sea level. Here the number of clear nights suitable for observation reaches 150-180 per year.

== History ==
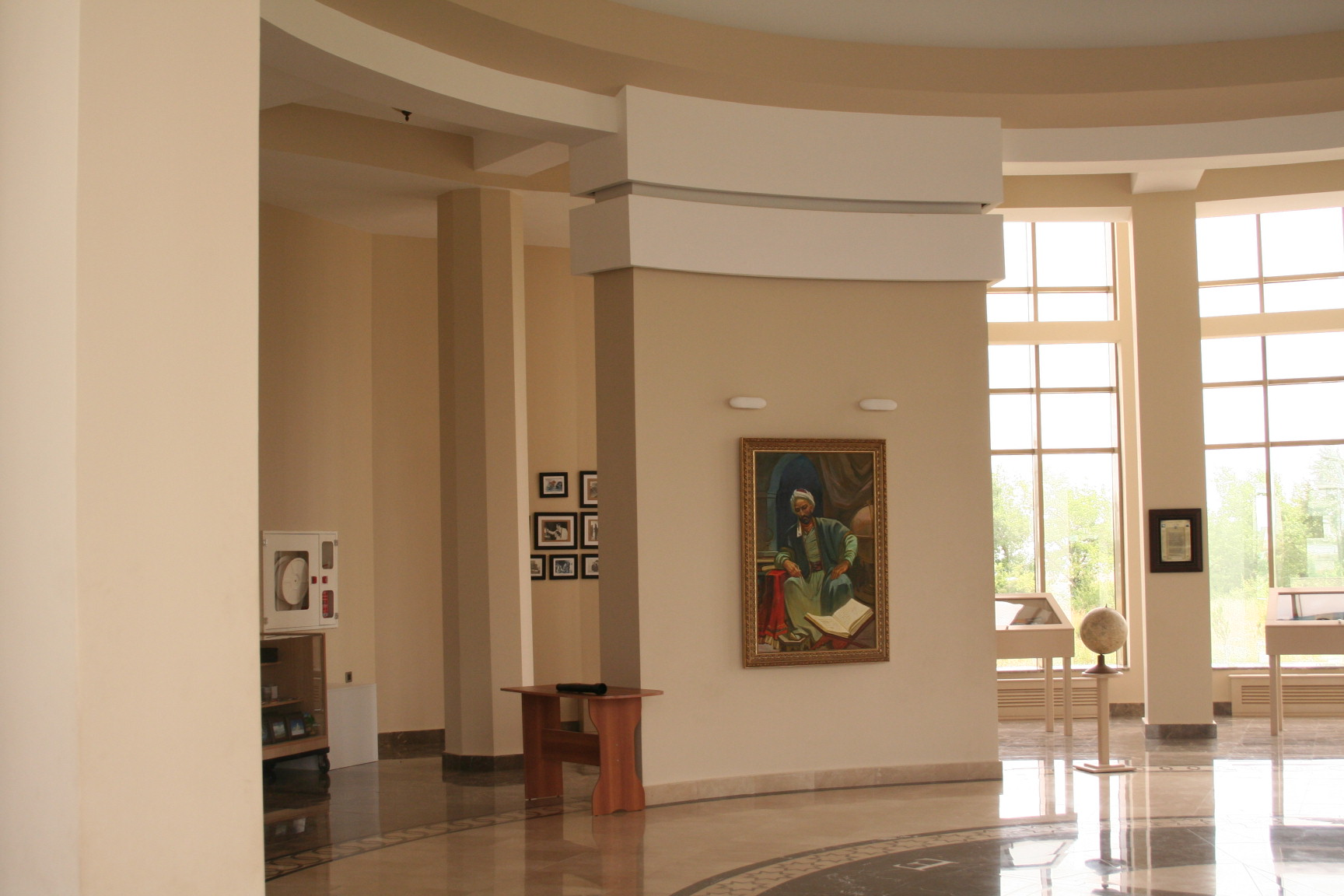
Interior – exhibition hall

In 1927, the Astronomical Expedition was created to study the astroclimate in several regions of Azerbaijan. In Kalbajar, Lachin, Shamakhy, Khizi, and other regions of Azerbaijan, work was underway to select a suitable place for the future foundation of an astronomical observatory. As a result of research, in 1953, it was planned to build an observation base and then an observatory in the Pirqulu village of the Shamakhy region. The Observatory functioned as the department of Astrophysics within the Institute of Physics and Mathematics of the Azerbaijan Academy of Sciences and then, in 1956, as the Sector of Astrophysics of the Academy of Sciences. Since 1960, the Observatory has been included in the Azerbaijan Academy of Sciences with the status of an independent research institute.

Academician H.F.Sultanov, who contributed significantly to creating the Shamakhy Astrophysical Observatory, worked as the observatory director from 1960-to 1981. Under his organization and leadership in 1953–1959, along with astronomical observations, serious work was carried out on the design of the future Observatory, the acquirement of telescopes and other equipment, the Observatory's structure, and the training of staff in the field of astronomy. In addition, eminent scientists M.M.Aliyev, Y.X.Mamedaliev, X.M. Abdullaev, R.E. Huseynov, and G.J. Mammadbayli played an essential role in creating and developing ShAO. In the training of scientific staff should be noted the work of employees of the Moscow State University named after M. V. Lomonosov, Leningrad State University named after A. S. Pushkin, Pulkovo Astronomical Observatory of RAS, the Crimean Astrophysical Observatory of RAS, the Institute of Terrestrial Magnetism, Ionosphere and Radiowave Propagation named after N.V.Pushkov (IZMIRAN).

In 1957, the first telescope, the Chromospheric-Photospheric Solar Telescope, was installed at the Pirgulu Astronomical Station. In 1959, a 200-mm photoelectric telescope was put into operation, with the help of which the problem of studying the astroclimate of the area was solved. In subsequent years, the following telescopes were put into operation: the Horizontal Solar Telescope (1962), the AST-452 Telescope (1964), the AZT-8 Telescope (1970), and the Zeiss-600 Telescope (1980). Special meaning in supplying the Shamakhy Astrophysical Observatory is the acquisition of a telescope with a mirror diameter of 2 m, put into operation in September 1966. Produced by the company "Carl Zeiss" of the German Democratic Republic, this telescope is the third-largest in the former USSR after two identical Russian-made 2.6-meter telescopes installed at the Crimean Astrophysical Observatory of the RAS and the Byurakan Astrophysical Observatory. A unique role in acquiring and putting this famous optical telescope into operation, considered the flagship of experimental science in Azerbaijan, was played by the former president of the Azerbaijan Academy of Sciences, academician Yusif Mammadaliyev and the former vice-president, people's poet Samad Vurgun.

From 1960 to 1980, regular astrophysical observations were carried out at ShAO. In the same years, much attention was paid to staff training in astrophysics. For this purpose, by a particular order of the national leader Haydar Aliyev, in 1976, the Department of Astrophysics was established at the Azerbaijan State University. This department played an important role in training qualified personnel in astronomy. In 1981, by the decision of the Cabinet of Ministers, the Shamakhy Astrophysical Observatory was named after the great Azerbaijani astronomer Nasreddin Tusi. In 1973, the Batabat department, located in the Nakhchivan Autonomous Republic, was merged with the ShAO. In 1997, the Aghdara observational station, which operated on the territory of the Nakhchivan Autonomous Republic during the Soviet period and became the proprietorship of the Azerbaijani state after gaining independence, was also transferred to the balance sheet of the ShAO.

According to the order of our national leader Haydar Aliyev dated August 7, 2002, "On the establishment of the Nakhchivan branch of the National Academy of Sciences of Azerbaijan," the Batabat Astrophysical Observatory, together with the Aghdara observational station was transferred to the Nakhchivan branch of the National Academy of Sciences of Azerbaijan, and now operates as an independent observatory. Here, processing and analysis of observational materials and research in theoretical astrophysics are carried out. BCB is particularly important in coordinating the observatory activities and its collaboration with other structures and research institutes of ANAS and with the city's universities. Here, dissertations are defended, regular scientific seminars are held, scientific journals of the Observatory are issued, and the official website is managed. In September 2008, the observatory underwent major repairs.

== Observatory directors ==
- 1959-1981- Academician Sultanov Hajibay Farajulla oglu;
- 1981-1982- Doctor of physical-mathematical sciences Huseynov Oktay Khansafar oglu
- 1982-1985-Ph.D. in physical-mathematical sciences Abbasov Alik Rza oglu;
- 1985-1986-Ph.D. in physical-mathematical sciences Ismailov Zohrab Abbasali oglu;
- 1986-1988-Ph.D. in physical-mathematical sciences Rustamov Kamran Ahmad oglu;
- 1988-1997-PhD in physics and mathematics Ehmedov Shmidt Bunyad oglu;
- 1997-2015-Corresponding Member of ANAS Doctor of physical-mathematical sciences Quliyev Eyyub Salah oglu;
- From 2015 to the present, Corresponding Member of ANAS Doctor of physical-mathematical sciences Jalilov Namig Sardar oglu.

== Telescopes ==
The observatory measured the light polarization of Comet d'Arrest during the Soviet period.

- The reflector with a diameter of 2 meters was manufactured by the German company "Carl Zeiss JENA" and put into operation in 1966. The main mirror is parabolic, D=2080 mm, F=9000 mm.
- Telescope AZT-8, the main mirror is parabolic D=700 mm, F=2820 mm. The first Cassegrain system F=11200 mm, relative aperture 1:16 and angle of view 40' or 13x13 cm2.
- Telescope Zeiss-600, the main mirror is parabolic D=600 mm, F=2400 mm; Cassegrain system Feqv = 7500 mm.
- AST-452, Maksutov-Cassegrain meniscus telescope, meniscus lens D=350 mm, mirror D=490 mm, spotting scope F=1200 mm. The scale on the focal surface of the telescope is 2.86'/mm. The luminous intensity of the telescope is 1:3.4. The telescope can operate in 2 optical systems: Primary focus and Newtonian focus. The angle of view at the primary focus is 4°14', the linear size of the field is 90 mm, and at the Newton, the focus is 2°52' and 60 mm, respectively.
- Azimuthal coelostat ASK-5, main mirror D=440 mm, Newton's mirror D=200 mm, F=17500 mm.
- AFR-3 Chromospheric-Photospheric Telescope, objective D=130 mm, Feq=9000 mm.
- The AZT-15 telescope, a 1-meter Schmidt system, was brought to the Observatory in 1975, but the telescope was not installed yet due to the disappearance of the main mirror for unknown reasons. The rest of the telescope equipment is stored in the warehouse at the ShAO. The Observatory administration is negotiating with the leadership of the Russian Academy of Sciences on the installation of the telescope jointly with Russia.

=== Light-receivers and other devices ===
The 2-meter telescope has the following light receivers:

Canberra spectrograph with 2x2 prism - for spectral observation of faint objects;

Three-chamber and two-diffraction spectrograph of the primary focus;

Cassegrain focus spectrograph of medium resolution;

CCD photometer BVRc for studying faint objects;

Coudé focus of Echelle spectrograph

SHAFES - high resolution fiber optic spectrograph for Cassegrain focus (R = 56000, 28000, λ 3700-9000Å);

UAGS + Canon + CCD Andor - for spectral observation of faint objects;

CCD photometer operating on BVRcIC system used on Zeiss-600 telescope; The telescope is equipped with a Celestron F/6.3 focus reducer, the optical power increased by 1.6 times.

ASP-20 spectrograph with F = 7000 mm in ASG coelostat; D = 1.12 Å/mm, λ 3600-7000 Å;

Two objective prisms with refraction angles of 15˚ and 35˚40' using on the AST-452 telescope;

Aluminizing vacuum installation;

In 2012, a cryogenic installation for the production of liquid nitrogen LNP-20 was installed and put into operation for cooling CCD light receivers.

In 2007, a German-made B-240 vacuum apparatus was put into operation for aluminizing the surface of astronomical mirrors.

== Acting departments ==
- Galaxies and star formation processes;
- Binary stars and eruptive processes;
- Physics of Stellar Atmospheres and Magnetism;
- Astronomical devices and innovative technologies;
- Theoretical astrophysics and cosmology;
- Cosmic plasma and helio-geophysical problems;
- Planets and small celestial bodies.

== Library ==
The Shamakhy Astrophysical Observatory Scientific Library was created at the same time as the observatory. It consists of two major halls. The reading room was organized in the first hall. There is an exhibition of new books, periodicals, magazines, and encyclopedias. In the second large hall, literature in Russian and other foreign languages is systematically placed. It has more than 14,000 books, more than 2500 magazines (21 in Russian, 23 in English, 8 local magazines), 5 newspapers ("Azerbaijan", "People", "Republic", "Science" and "Search"), ancient and rare editions, manuscripts, field dictionaries and encyclopedias, reference journals and other special scientific and technical literature. The library carries out the international exchange of books in more than 25 countries (more than 45 foreign institutions and organizations), exhibitions, etc., and is closely involved in organizing events. The library plays an important role in the field of astrophysics and astronomy, as well as in publishing publications and electronic editions.

== Main scientific journal ==
Azerbaijan Astronomical Journal (in English)

== Directions of modern research ==
- Solar physics - activity, atmosphere, mechanisms of solar-terrestrial relations.
- Young stars, supergiants, Wolf-Rayet, symbiotic, magnetic stars.
- The Solar System bodies - planets, comets, and asteroids.
- Active galactic nuclei, quasars
- Some actual problems of theoretical astrophysics and cosmology.

== Eminent astronomers ==
- Hajibey Farajulla oglu Sultanov
- Nadir Baba oglu Ibragimov
- Huseynov Rahim Ayyub oglu
- Suleyman Gulu oglu Zeynalov
- Inglab Asad oglu Aslanov
- Zohrab Abbasali Ismailov
- Mammad Karimbekov
- Oktay Huseynov
- Teymur Aminzade
- Sarı Azimov
- Rahim Zeynalov
- Jafar Guluzade
- Khabibulla Mammadli

== Great events ==
- Congress of the International Astronautical Federation (1972)
- International conferences on the study of magnetic stars (1973, 1976)
- Plenum of the Astronomical Council of the USSR Academy of Sciences (1984)
- Assemblies "Tusi-800" (8 conferences for 1998–2002)
- Periodicity and Cosmological Problems (2003)
- International conference dedicated to the 60th anniversary of the ShAO (2019)
- Modern trends in studies of physics and dynamics of the Solar system bodies. (2021)

== See also ==
- List of astronomical observatories
