= Tafakkur University =

Science and Education Center - Tafakkur University
- Science and Education Center - Tafakkur University
- Type: Public
- Established: 1995
- Rector: Prof. Dr. Atakişiyev Müşfiq
- Location: Baku, Azerbaijan

Tafakkur University (from Azerbaijani tafakkur - "contemplation") is a higher education institution in Azerbaijan that began operations in 1992. It is a successor of the Azerbaijan Trade Institute.

The university was founded by President of Azerbaijan 24 September 1994 212 No. based on the decision of State Ali Expert Commission of Azerbaijan on the opinion of the Republic Council of Ministers on 11 September 1995, 202 numbered by the decision of "Creation" non-state University is registered as a higher education institution. Azerbaijan Cabinet of Ministers "Contemplation" about to be registered in the University "September 11, 1995 adds dated 202 numbered decision and on amendments by 29 May 1996 67 Decision No." Contemplation "University of Science and Education Center" Contemplation "University is named. Science and Education Center "Contemplation" by considering the University vəsadət Ministers of Education of Azerbaijan Republic "on the creation Magistratura the" order No. 295 of 30 April 1999 were allowed to graduate from preparation in college. Bakalavriat in college, career in science at all levels of education plans prepared and approved in accordance with the basic training program. University management and operations of the Azerbaijan Republic is regulated by the Constitution and the laws of the Republic of Azerbaijan in the field of education, forming the basis for higher education institutions, the Republic of Azerbaijan Ministry of Education, regulatory actions, Science and Education Center "Contemplation" University Charter, as recommended by the Ministry of Education in accordance with the normative documents is made. Instruction is available in the scientific process and make appropriate decisions for all activities envisaged by the Charter and Certificate of description.

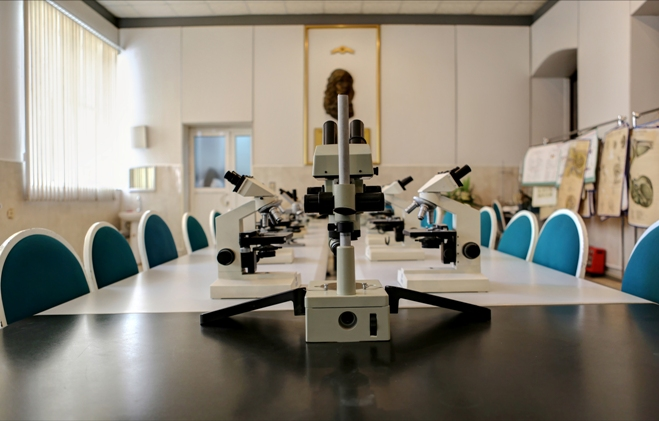
Tefekkur

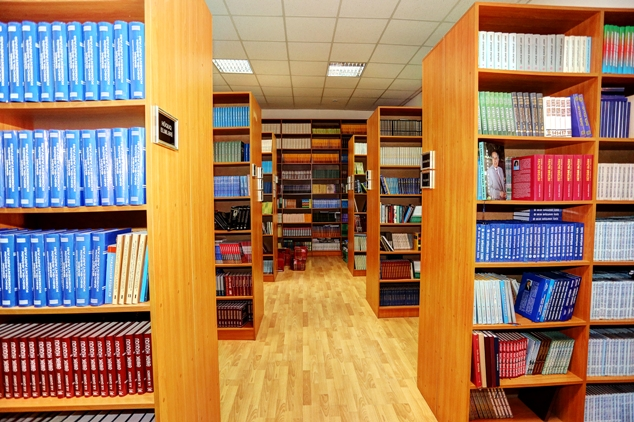
Tefekkur

== Faculties ==
- Faculty of Economy and Transport
- Resources and Faculty of Biology

== Kafedr ==
- Economy
- Philological Sciences
- Biology and natural sciences
- Physical education and sport
- Transportation and application of mechanics
- Foreign Language Teaching and its training
- Mathematical and Informatics and the

== Training is done in the following vocational courses at the university ==
- Biology teacher
- Azerbaijani Language and Literature teacher
- Primary classroom teaching
- Foreign language teacher
- Foreign language teacher
- Finance
- The world economy
- Accounting and auditing
- Transportation construction engineering
- Above ground vehicle engineering
- Delivery and management of the organization in transportation engineering

== Centers and Laboratories ==
- Computer center
- Linqafo center
- Biology and chemistry lab
- Transportation and physics laboratory

== International relations ==
Bilateral cooperation with foreign universities International training program on Science and Education Center "Contemplation" University participation Collaboration with the international scientific-educational institutions International assosiasiya of the University "Contemplation" Associates of the University. As in all areas of our republic after its independence, there was a significant innovation in the field of education. Azerbaijani Soviet era was quite small squares to international relations. To address this gap in international relations faculties in public and private higher education college in the early 1990s, began to kafedr and branches are created. ETM "Creation" in the University, "International Relations" section has been created. The establishment and development of this branch is connected with the name of the university administration. "Contemplation" University, the world's leading educational institutions - California (USA), Istanbul Technical University (Turkey), Technische Universität Berlin (Germany), Brno Technical University (Czech Republic), Institute of Baltic Russian Language (Latvia), as well as Russia ' s, the Ukraine, you Beloru, Tatarıst the Georgia signed agreements relating to university students and faculty exchange program. Only in 2013 the Republic of Belarus Baraoviç State University, next to the President of the Russian Federation Russian Folk Teserrüfat Academy Maxaçqal branch, Russian Federation Astrakhan State University "Contemplation" signed a cooperation agreement between the University. This agreement allows you to carry out research work in the field of education and culture to the universities. "Contemplation" University names mentioned countries to fruitful cooperation with universities, science and education in relation to further expand the learning of advanced training methods and implementation, teachers and helpful including joint participation in international projects and programs for the exchange of students continue their cooperation. Zasəmədzadə academic well-known scholars of our Republic has guided long kafedra International Relations and has participated actively in the preparation of this specialist staff. University graduates are prepared by the international economic relations in the area of their profession, they ferqlen from other areas by the creative direction. Last year in our country and beyond the University's employees now - the US, Russia, Romania, Italy, Turkey, Ukraine, Kazakhstan and other countries have published dozens of articles move. "Contemplation" University of Europe, USA, CIS, Turkey, North Cyprus continues its fruitful cooperation with universities, expansion of cooperation in science and education area, the learning of advanced training methods and implementation, teacher and international projects for the exchange of students and programs in public participation and so on. Has signed agreements covering several useful. To their main principles and strategic task - our republic remains faithful to the preparation of highly qualified personnel and patriotic work for "Creation" is the University of times and always
