= Salatin, Iran =

Salatin سلاطين
- Village
- Location within Iran
- Coordinates: 33°50′09″N 47°20′42″E
- Country: Iran
- Province: Kermanshah
- County: Kermanshah
- Bakhsh: Firuzabad
- Rural District: Osmanvand

Population (2006)
  - Total: 87
- Time zone: UTC+3:30 (IRST)
  - Summer (DST): UTC+4:30 (IRDT)

Salatin (Persian: سلاطين, also Romanized as Salāţīn; also known as Sīr Kāneh) is a village in Osmanvand Rural District, Firuzabad District, Kermanshah County, Kermanshah Province, Iran. At the 2006 census, its population was 87, in 20 families.
