= Elshan Hajizadeh =

Azerbaijani professor and doctor of economic sciences

- Elşən Hacızadə
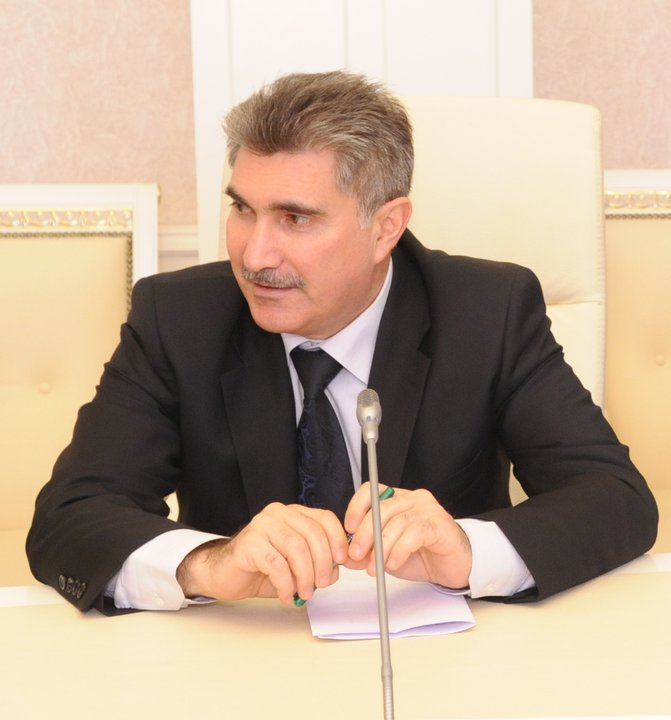

Personal details
- Born: 9 August 1961 (age 65) Siyəzən Azerbaijan
- Awards: Taraggi; For service to the Fatherland Order; Azerbaijan Democratic Republic 100th anniversary medal
- Website: www.hajizada.com

Elshan Mahmud oglu Hajizadeh (Azerbaijani: Elşən Mahmud oğlu Hacızadə; born 9 August 1961) is an Azerbaijani professor, doctor of economic sciences Academician of International Academy of Sciences (Austria), Academician of International Academy of Management, an Academician of International Transport Academy, Academician of the Asian Academy of Sciences (People's Republic of China), foreign Member of the Russian Academy of Natural Sciences, Member of the International Union of Economists. Associate member of the International Nobel Center for information.

== Education ==
In 1982, he graduated from the account-economic faculty of the Azerbaijan Economic Institute name after D.Bunyadzadeh.

== Labour activity ==
In 1982–1997, Hajizadeh worked in various managerial positions in the professions of financier, accountant and economist in the Fuel and energy Complex of Azerbaijan (SOCAR , Oil and gas extraction company H.Z.Taghiev, Production association of oil and gas on land, Joint-Stock Company “Azerigaz”).

In 1997–2014, he worked at different positions in the field of science and education:

- Union of Economists of Azerbaijan - expert;

- Azerbaijan National Academy of Sciences (ANAS) Institute of Economics:

Sector of “Structural changes” - head, Department of “Macroeconomic Development and Economic Growth” - chief scientific officer;

- Azerbaijan State University of Economics - UNEC: “Socio-Economic Research Laboratory” - head, “Center for research and consulting on the development of regions of Azerbaijan” - director, “Masters Training Center” - deputy director.

-In 2010–2018 years he worked as Chief Editor of the “Tax Journal of Azerbaijan” “Tax Journal of Azerbaijan”.

-Since 2019 he has been the head of the "Center of energy Economics" of Azerbaijan State University of Economics - UNEC.

-Since 2019 editor-in-chief of ENECO (Energy Economics) journal.

-Since 2025 editor-in-chief of the journal Asian Economic Science - ASES.

-Since 2022 First Vice-President of the Azerbaijan Section of the International Academy of Sciences (IAS-HE AS).

-Since 2025 Vice-President of the Asian Academy of Sciences - AAS and Director of the Asian Institute of Economics - AIE.

- Since 2026, he has served as Chairman of the National Chapter of the Asian Academy of Sciences - AAS in the Republic of Azerbaijan.

II degree is a state adviser.

== Scientific degree ==
1. PhD in Economics. 1998. Theme: "Economic reforms and problems of their perfection in oil and gas extraction industry on land" Specialty: 08.00.05 - Economy, planning and organization of management of the national economy and his branches (industry)] and received the degree of PhD in Economics.
2. Doctor in Economics. 2005. Theme: "Challenges of increase of oil recovery and gas on land of Azerbaijan" Specialty: 08.00.05 - Economy and management of the national economy (economics, the organization and management of complexes, branches and enterprises)] and received the degree of
3. Associate professor - diploma DSNo.03505 2010. The decision of the Higher Attestation Commission under the President of Azerbaijan Republic (protocol No. 17-K 20.04.2010).
4. Professor - diploma PRNo.01291 2013. The decision of the Higher Attestation Commission under the President of Azerbaijan Republic (protocol No. 16-R 15.11.2013).

== Scientific and pedagogical activity ==
He is the author of 240 proceedings (381,6 p.sh.), including 10 monographs, 1 textbook, 3 educational programs, 5 methodical instruction, 1 methodical recommendation, 1 bibliographic collection, 8 brochures, about 30 articles on various social themes. He made reports at the international conferences, congresses and symposium in foreign countries; more than 30 scientific articles have been published in various editions of a number of foreign countries. In 1997–2010 years he was a lecturer at Tefekkur University, in 2010–2018 years, he worked as a professor at the - Azerbaijan State Economic University "International Economic Relations" Department and "International Economics" Departments.

== Monographs ==
1. Economic reforms and challenges of efficiency in the oil and gas extraction complex in the land of Azerbaijan. Baku: "Science", 1998, 144 p., 9,0 pp, 300 copies, scientific editor: the academician of Azerbaijan National Academy of Sciences Z.A.Samedzadeh. In the monograph the stages of development and the tendency from the foreshortening of new sights, the dynamics of the oil and gas extraction manufacture in the land, are analysed, necessity of new structural changes is scientifically proved with the purpose of perfection of management of oil and gas extraction complex, formation of structure and the realization of the economic mechanism which are meeting the requirements of area is offered.
2. A power complex on the eve of new reforms . Baku: "Science", 2000, 257 p., 22,0 pp, 300 copies, scientific editors: doctor of economics, professor A.A.Aghayeva, T.A.Pashayev. The monograph is devoted to the analysis and estimation of global power engineering within the framework of globalization, problems of consolidation of global power resources, acceleration, perfection and deepening of process of the reforms causing the stable economic development in the Fuel and Energy Complex of Azerbaijan in the conditions of market relations.
3. Directions of formation of new market mechanisms in the oil and gas industry. (Together with T.A.Pashayev) Baku: "Science", 2000, 200 p., 12,5 pp, 300 copies, scientific editors: doctor of economic A.H.Nuriyev, doctor of economics, professor A.A.Aghayeva. The modern condition of the oil and gas industry, the tendency of development in the context of new realities, economic aspects of maintenance of stable development, perfection of taxation, fiscal mechanisms in the oil and gas industry and questions of application of other market formations are investigated in the monograph.
4. Potential of natural gas of Azerbaijan: realities and virtual features. Baku: "Science", 2001, 186 p., 12,5 pp, 350 copies, scientific editor: doctor of economics, professor A.S.Shakaraliyev. The monograph is devoted to estimation of the growing potential of natural gas of Azerbaijan in range of existing realities and virtual visibility, modern condition of the gas industry, tendencies of integration and development, formation of new flexible infrastructure in the context of market economy, and to the analysis and research of global and local perspective opportunities of natural gas in the big economic-technical turnover.
5. Model of economic development of the oil and gas extraction complex. Baku: "Science", 2002, 472 p., 29,5 pp, 500 copies, scientific editor: the academician of Azerbaijan National Academy of Sciences A.M.Abbasov. The lead of the monograph describes the research of the general economic problems of the oil and gas extraction industry developing on the land of Azerbaijan in sphere of going deep market relations, development of new economic model of branch complex in maintenance of industrial growth, perfection of the lead reforms. In research have also found the reflection of research tendencies of dynamic development of structural reforms on the basis of genetic analysis, development of new strategy of structural reforms and managements in the context of regular approach, use of the advanced market mechanisms, economic technologies in the decision of problems of economic modernization of complex, in the organization of effective activity.
6. Modernization of economic structure of oil economy. (Together with Z.S.Abdullayev) Baku: "Science", 2003, 511 p., 32 pp, 300 copies, scientific editor: doctor of economics, professor Associate Member of the Azerbaijan National Academy of Sciences A.F.Musayev. In the monograph describing the dynamic factors of development of effective economic construction in the context of technical and economic structure of the world and national oil industry and tendencies of progress, in the range of system and situational approach are studied and social and economic aspects of oil strategy, and also perfection, deepening, state regulation, the concept of management and the problem of rational organization of manufacture are analysed, priorities of alternative and market mechanisms of modernization of economic structure of oil and gaz sectors are submitted according to the principles of verification.
7. Socialized economics. Baku: "Science", 2006, 509 p., 32,0 pp, 300 copies, scientific editor: the academician of the Azerbaijan National Academy of Sciences Z.A.Samedzadeh. The scientific-analytical expression the research of principles of the economic and social composition of long development of society, interpretation in the historically-philosophical foreshortening, a revealed vector of a civilization in socialized economics have found their reflection in the given monograph. The elements of connection forming the socialized economics and transforming it into a single whole: the socioeconomic phenomena, demographic change, optimum costs, social guarantees, local managing, a circle of regional and global integration, power and resource supply of economy, construction of an open community and civil society, perspective economic realities of Islam is the leading idea of the research analysis.
8. Social and economic challenges of regions. (on examples of region Sheki-Zagatala). The collective monograph. (Together with A.S.Qasimov, H.A.Israfilov, E.A.Agayev). Baku: "Publishing house of Economic University". 2006. 304 pages. Volume 19,0p.sh., 500 copies. Published by the decision of the Scientific Council of the Azerbaijan State Economic University. Scientific Advisor: Ph.D., Professor. S.H.Hajiyev. Scientific Editor: the academician of Azerbaijan National Academy of Sciences A.A.Nadirov. Reviewers: Ph.D, Professor. R.K.Mamedov. Ph.D., associate professor S.T.Valiev. The book contains an analysis of the complex issues of socio-economic development of the Sheki-Zagatala region of the Azerbaijan Republic. The monograph is written with a view to providing scientific and methodical, scientific and practical assistance to an employee of the state executive authorities and municipal structures
9. World ranking of Azerbaijan's economy. Baku, "Science" 2011. 128 p. 8,0 pp, 500 copies. (Together with E.R.Bagirzadeh) scientific editor: the academician of the Azerbaijan National Academy of Sciences Z.A.Samedzadeh In the book "World Ranking of Azerbaijan's Economy", published first in a series of annual publications, represented the leading global reports rating organizations, as well as links to national statistical sources in Azerbaijan, which during the past 20 years determined its position among the world's major quantitative and qualitative indicators. In fact, monograph is the first modern edition in this field in Azerbaijan and is intended primarily for use
10. Nobel economy. Monography. Baku: Science, 2020. 23,0 pp, 500 copies. Scientific Advisor: the academician of the Azerbaijan National Academy of Sciences Z.A.Samedzadeh. The establishment of the Nobel Prize in Economics and the creative work of the laureates in this category over the past 50 years have generally contributed to the formation of a new stage in economic science. In the monograph with the subject analysis and the conceptual justification of achievement of researchers of the post-Keynesian period in synchronization with results of activity of laureates which essentially improved the maintenance of economic theories and formed new currents and directions in economic science it is necessary to call a stage “Nobel economy”. In addition, the research paper for the first time suggested purposeful to consider the replacement of the term “Nobel laureates in Economics” laconic term “Nobel economists”.

== Textbook ==
1. World economy and Azerbaijan. Baku, “Letterpress” publishing house, 2018, 912 p., 57,0 p.sh., 500 copies. Scientific consultant: the academic of Azerbaijan National Academy of Sciences Z.A.Samedzadeh. The manual is devoted to the theoretical foundations and practical issues of formation and development of the world economy, including the trends of globalization, the pace and proportions of development, international capital movements, the characteristics of the world market of goods and services, as well as pricing processes, currency and financial relations and other relevant issues. The specificity and important aspect of the course are associated with the identification of the role and place of the Republic of Azerbaijan in the international division of labor, analysis and presentation of its prospects for deeper integration into the world economy. It is intended for students, candidates of Sciences, teachers, researchers, specialists, as well as those who are interested in the problems of the world economy.

== Bibliographic collection ==
Elshan Hajizadeh. Bibliography.

Dedicated to the 60 anniversary. Baku: “Elm” 2021, 424 p. 26,5 pp, 300 copies. Editor-in-Chief: academician Z.A.Samadzade. Editors: Corresponding members of ANAS A.F.Musayev, Q.C.Imanov, doctors of economic sciences, professors V.T.Novruzov, H.A.Israfilov. Compilers: PhD in economics, associate professor E.Z.Samadzade, E.A.Aliyev, S.A.Sultanov Elshan Hajizade. Biobibliography. Published by the joint decisions of the Scientific Council of the Union of Economists of Azerbaijan and the Scientific Council the Center for Energy Economics of the Azerbaijan State University of Economics (UNEC). The biobibliographic publication is dedicated to the life, scientific, pedagogical, labor and social activities of the Doctor of Economic Sciences, Professor Elshan Mahmud oglu Hajizade. The publication includes in Azerbaijani, Russian and English the important dates of the events of the author's life, the main directions of his scientific activity, certificates, diplomas, certificates and other certificates obtained in connection with the academic degree, academic title and education, a bibliography of scientific works, a list of journalistic articles and research works performed in the field of science and education, prepared projects, reviews of books in the press, participation in dissertation councils and round tables, dissertations in which he is an official opponent, information is also provided information is about the scientific editorial boards of which he is a member and head.

== Curricula ==
1. The economic analysis. Curriculum for undergraduate students majoring in II-01-02.01 "Accounting and Auditing". "Science and Education Center" Senior Lecturer of the University of Thought, Ph.D. in economics E.M.Hajizadeh. Editor: Azerbaijan State Economic University Vice-Rector for Scientific Affairs, doctor of economic Sciences, professor A.S.Shakaraliyev. Reviewers: Head of the Department of Statistics of the Azerbaijan State Economic University, doctor of economic Sciences, professor S.M.Yagubov, associate professor of the Department of Economic Analysis and Auditing of the Azerbaijan State Economic University, Ph.D. in economics F.Sh.Hajiyev. Baku: the Ministry of Education of the Azerbaijan Republic, 2002, 1.0 p.sh.
2. The theory of bookkeeping and bases of audit. II-01-02.01 Program of the course "Accounting Theory and Basics of Auditing" for higher education institutions majoring in accounting and auditing "Science and Education Center" Senior Lecturer of the University of Thought E.M.Hajizadeh. Editor: Head of the Department of State Regulation of Economy, Azerbaijan State Economic University, doctor of economic Sciences, professor H.B.Allahverdiyev. Reviewers: Rector of the University of Thought, doctor of economics M.J.Atakishiyev, Head of the Department of Accounting and Auditing, Azerbaijan State Economic University, Ph.D. in economics, associate professor Sh.M.Sabzaliyev. Baku: the Ministry of Education of the Azerbaijan Republic, 2002, 1,5] p.sh.
3. International investments. (Together with I.A.Kerimli and M.İ.Barkhudarov) Head of the Department of International Economics of Azerbaijan State Economic University, doctor of economics, professor I.A.Kerimli, professor of the Department of International Economics of Azerbaijan State Economic University, doctor of economics E.M.Hajizadeh, Director of the Russian School of Economics of Azerbaijan State Economic University, Ph.D. in economics, associate professor M.I.Barkhudarov. Scientific editor: Rector of Azerbaijan State Economic University, doctor of economic Sciences, professor A.J.Muradov. Reviewers: Head of the Department of World Economy, Baku State University, doctor of economics, professor H.B.Rustambeyov, Head of the Department of Economic Theory and History of Economic Thought of the Institute of Economics of the Azerbaijan National Academy of Sciences, doctor of economics, professor Y.Z.Yuzbashiyeva. Director of the Baku Business Training Center of the Ministry of Economy of the Republic of Azerbaijan, Ph.D. in economics, associate professor A.H.Farrukhov. Baku: the Ministry of Education of the Azerbaijan Republic, 2016, 2,5 p.sh.

== Methodical aids ==
1. Methodological guide for conducting the social survey process (Together with H.Q.Ahmedov) Methodical instructions. Head of the "Socio-economic research" laboratory of the Azerbaijan State Economic University, Ph.D. in economics E.M.Hajizadeh, associate professor of the Department of Politology and Sociology of the Azerbaijan State Economic University, Ph.D. of philosophical sciences. Editor: Vice-Rector for Scientific Affairs of the Azerbaijan State Economic University, doctor of economic sciences, professor A.S.Shakaraliyev. Reviewers: Head of the Department of Marketing of Production Facilities of the Azerbaijan State Economic University, doctor of economics, professor Sh.A.Akhundov, Dean of the Faculty of Advanced Training and Retraining of the Academy of Management under the President of the Republic of Azerbaijan, doctor of philosophy, professor Sh.J.Gasimli, Head of the Department of the Political Science and Sociology associate professor, Ph.D. of philosophical philosophical sciences X.H.Orujov. Baku: the Ministry of Education of the Azerbaijan Republic, 2003, 1,8 p.sh.
2. On the carrying out of scientific research practice. Methodical instructions. Head of the “Socio-economic research” laboratory of the Azerbaijan State Economic University, Ph.D. in economics E.M.Hajizadeh. Editor: Vice-Rector for Scientific Affairs of the Azerbaijan State Economic University, doctor of economic sciences, professor A.S.Shakaraliyev. Reviews: Full member of the Azerbaijan National Academy of Sciences, academician H.F.Sultanov, head of the department of Science of the Azerbaijan State Economic University, Ph.D. in economics associate professor N.R.Guliyev, deputy professor of the Department of Economic Informatics and AIS of the Azerbaijan State Economic University doctor of economic sciences R.A.Balayev. Baku: the Ministry of Education of the Azerbaijan Republic, 2004.1,5 p.sh.
3. Methodological guide to the implementation of the master's thesis (Together with H.A.Israfilov). Methodical instructions. Director of the Master's Training Center of the Azerbaijan State Economic University, Ph.D. in economics associate professor H.A.Israfilov, Deputy Director of the Master's Training Center of the Azerbaijan State Economic University, doctor of economic sciences, professor E.M.Hajizadeh. Editor: Rector of Azerbaijan State Economic University, doctor of economic sciences, professor S.H.Hajiyev. Reviewers: Head of the Department of Economic Cybernetics, Azerbaijan State Economic University, doctor of economic sciences, professor B.I.Musayev, Dean of the Master's Department of the Azerbaijan State Oil Academy, Ph.D. in economics associate professor V.T.Mustafayev. Baku: “Publishing house of Economic University”, 2007, 2,6 p.sh.
4. Methodical instructions of scientific-pedagogical practice. (Together with H.A.Israfilov) Methodical instructions. Director of the Master's Training Center of Azerbaijan State Economic University, Ph.D. in economics associate professor H.A.Israfilov, Deputy Director of the Master's Training Center of the Azerbaijan State Economic University, doctor of economic sciences, professor E.M.Hajizadeh. Editor: Rector of Azerbaijan State Economic University, doctor of economic sciences, professor S.H.Hajiyev. Reviewers: Vice-Rector of the Azerbaijan State Economic University, doctor of economic sciences A.I.Bayramov, Director of the Center for Economic Reforms of the Ministry of Economic Development of the Republic of Azerbaijan, Ph.D. in economics V.A.Rustamov. Baku: “Publishing House of Economic University”, 2007, 2,6 p.sh.
5. Methodical manual for the implementation of scientific-pedagogical practice (Together with H.A.Israfilov). Director of the Master's Training Center of the Azerbaijan State Economic University, Ph.D. in economics, associate professor H.A.Israfilov, Deputy Director of the Master's Training Center of the Azerbaijan State Economic University, doctor of economic sciences, professor E.M.Hajizadeh. Editor: Rector of the Azerbaijan State Economic University, doctor of economic sciences, professor S.H.Hajiyev. Reviewers: Head of the Education Department of the Azerbaijan State Economic University, Ph.D. in economics, associate professor A.M.Mirzayev, Head of the Department of International Economic Relations of the Azerbaijan International University, doctor of economics, professor I.A.Karimov.
6. Methodical reference for the implementation of master's essay. (Together with H.A.Israfilov and E.R.Baghirzadeh). Director of the Master's Training Center of the Azerbaijan State Economic University, Ph.D. in economics, associate professor H.A.Israfilov, Deputy Director of the Master's Training Center of the Azerbaijan State Economic University, doctor of economic sciences, professor E.M.Hajizadeh, Senior Inspector of the Master's Training Center of the Azerbaijan State Economic University E.R.Bagirzadeh. Editor: Doctor of economic sciences, professor S.H.Hajiyev, Azerbaijan State Economic University. Reviewers: Dean of the Faculty of Commerce of the Azerbaijan State Economic University, doctor of economic sciences, professor G.N.Manafov, Head of the Department of Master's, Postgraduate and Doctoral Studies of Baku State University, Ph.D. in technical sciences, associate professor A.O.Mammadova. Baku: “Publishing House of Economic University”. 2009. 2,8 p.sh.

== Certificates ==
1. Preparation for the computer user course (MS DOS, WINDOWS). State Committee of Science and Technology of the Republic of Azerbaijan. Baku, September-December 1997. Certificate - Baku: C № 000092, 4 December 1997.
2. Seminar on “Тhe Technical program of cooperation in the field of development of economic professional association”. Agency of the International Development of the USA (USAID), Washington: September 11 - October 2, 1999. The certificate - AED/Washington, DC. October, 2, 1999.
3. Seminar on “Тhe Technical program of cooperation in the field of development of economic professional association”. Institute of Public and Private Partnerships of the USA (IP3, the Institute for Public-Private Partnership), Washington: September 13 - October 1, 1999. The certificate - IP3/Washington, DC. October 2, 1999.
4. “Persian Gulf: XVI international conference”. Institute of Political and International Studies of the Ministry of Foreign Affairs of the Islamic Republic of Iran. February 17-18, Tehran: 2004. The certificate - Institute for political and International Studies. Tehran. 18 February 2004.
5. Seminar on “Environment, oil and gas: commercialization of technology in the Caspian region”. Civilian Research and Development Foundation of the USA (GRDF) and Azerbaijan National Science Foundation (ANSF), Baku, March 15-17, 2004. The certificate - GRDF-ANSF/Baku. March 17, 2004.
6. Symposium “Practical Business Training & Agricultural Workshop”. Civilian Research and Development Foundation of the USA (GRDF) and Azerbaijan National Science Foundation (ANSF) Baku on June 6-7, 2005. The certificate - GRDF-ANSF/Baku. June 7, 2005.
7. IX international Congress of social Sciences of the Turkic world. Turkish world research Foundation. Baku-Istanbul, June 15-17, 2011. Certificate - Coordinatorto Congress. Baku-Istanbul: June 17, 2011.
8. International Congress “Economics, Finance and Energy I”. Kh.Yasavi International Kazakh-Turkish University and International Turkic Academy. Kazakhstan, Almaty: June 11-14, 2014. The certificate - International Congress of Economics, Finance and Energy (EFE 2014), Kazakhstan, Almaty.
9. “Science and Technology in Modern Society: Problems, Prognoses and Solutions” The First İnternational Scientific-Practical Virtual Turkey-Azerbaijan Joint Conference. The International Center for Research, Education & Training. (Estonia Tallinn), Aspendos-Academy. İnternational Academy of Medical and Social Sciences. (UK, London). Turkey, İzmir September 26-27, 2020. Certificate of participation: Deputy and Shareholder N.A.İsazade, Baku: September 27, 2020.
10. “Modern trends of dialogue in a multinational society: philosophical, religious, legal view”. First international scientific and practical Ukrainian-Azerbaijani conference. Institute of Philosophy named after Grigory Skovoroda National Academy of Sciences of Ukraine (Ukraine, Kiev), Kiev University named after Boris Grinchenko (Ukraine, Kiev), Ukrainian Association of Religious Researchers (Ukraine, Kiev) International Scientific, Educational and Training Center LTD (United Kingdom, London) International Scientific -educational and training center MTÜ (Estonia, Tallinn). Certificate of participation - CERT.NO: MTDMS-2020-0032: Member of the Board of the Conference Olena Alexandrova. Kiev: 12 November 2020.
11. “Green Economy” Green Business, Green Management, and Leadership: The Road to a Grenn Economy, New Challenges, Opportunities and Perspectives” 10 th International Conference on Leadership, Technology, Innovation and Business Management 2022 (ICLTIBM-2022). Azerbaijan State University of Economics, Yıldız Technical University. Certificate of participation - Chairman of the Conference Prof. Dr Cemal Zehir. Yıldız Technical University, Co-Chair of the Conference Prof. Dr Zahid Farrux Mamedov.Azerbaijan State University of Economics. Baku: October 12^{th}-14th 2022.
12. “For Outstanding Contributions to Science” (Certifies the presentation of a commemorative watch and a crystal award engraved with his name to Elshan Hajizadeh). Honorary Certificate of the Asian Academy of Sciences. President of the Asian Academy of Sciences E.N. Khalilov, Secretary-General of the Asian Academy of Sciences R.N. Bakhtizin. Hong Kong, People's Republic of China, 2026.

== Editorial activity ==
1. The chief editor of journal “ENECO”. “Center of Energy Economics” Azerbaijan State University of Economics - UNEC. (2019 - at the present time).
2. The chief editor of “Tax Journal of Azerbaijan” of the Ministry of Taxes of the Azerbaijan Republic (2010-2018).
3. The deputy editor-in-chief. "Great Economic Encyclopedia". Seven-volume edition. Baku, East-West publishing house, 2012.
4. The member of the editorial staff of the scientific journal "Tefekkur" of the Scientific and Educational Centre Tafakkur University.
5. International consultant, honorary member of the editorial board, editor-in-chief of the economics department. Gulustan-Black Sea Scientific Journal of Academic Research. Republic of Georgia.
6. International consultant, honorary member of the editorial board, editor-in-chief of the economics department. The Caucasus-Economic and Social Analysis Journal of Southern Caucasus. Republic of Georgia.
7. International consultant, honorary member of the editorial board, editor-in-chief of the economics department. Proceeding of The International Research Education & Training Center.
8. Project developer. Special magazine dedicated to the 80th anniversary of Khachmaz district. Baku: LETTERPRESS, 2010. 120 p.
9. Reviewer. İsrafilov H.A. “Directions for improving consumer cooperation in the context of globalization” (monograph). Baku: Elm, 2010. 452 p.
10. Scientific editor. Q.E.Safarov, K.S.Dadashova. Quality and competitiveness of the oil and gas complex. Monograph. Baku: “Elm”, 2011, 224 p.sh.
11. Reviewer. E.E.Balayeva. Economic security and financial problems of development. Monograph. Baku: “Elm”, 2011, 396 p.sh.
12. Reviewer. Mamedov Y.A. “Formation and directions of development of the stock market of the Republic of Azerbaijan” Baku: “Europe” Publishing House, 2016. 162 p.
13. Member of the organizing committee and editorial board. “Modern science: problems, forecasts and solutions”. Sixth international scientific and practical conference. Tbilisi, Georgia March, 2016.
14. Member of the scientific editorial board. Materials of the Republican scientific conference “Azerbaijan economy in the period of changes in the global world economy” dedicated to the 75th anniversary of Academician Ziyad Samadzadeh. Azerbaijan National Academy of Sciences, Institute of Economy Azerbaijan National Academy of Sciences, Azerbaijan Union Of Economists. Baku: Science, 2019. 743 p.
15. Scientific editor. R.A.Zablotskaya, K.A.Mamedov. “The role of logistics services in global production networks”. Monograph. Baku: Science, 2020, 452 p.
16. Member of the Organizing Committee, Scientific Committee and Editorial Board. Azerbaijan-Turkey. “The first international scientific-practical virtual conference science and technology in modern society: problems, prognoses and solutions”. Turkey, İzmir September 26–27, 2020.
17. Member of the editorial board - “Heydar Aliyev and the model of national economic development of Azerbaijan”. Monography. Baku: Azerbaijan University of Architecture and Construction. “Publishing-printing” center. 2020. 496 p.
18. Member of the editorial board - International Council For Scientific Development. “Science Without Borders” Transactions of the International Academy of Science H&E. Austria. Innsbruck. Member of the editorial board.
19. Member of the editorial board - International Council For Scientific Development. International Academy of Azerbaijan Section: 20 Years. International Publishing House “Science Without Borders” (SWB), Baku-Innsbruck, Meinhardstrasse 10, A-6020 Innsbruck, Austria, 2022, 276 p. Member of the editorial board.
20. Member of the organizing committee and editorial board. Scientific session dedicated to the 80th anniversary of Academician Ziyad Samadzade. Baku 2020: international scientific conference on” New quality stage of Sustainable Development". Azerbaijan National Academy Of Sciences, Institute Of Economics Of Azerbaijan National Academy Of Sciences, Azerbaijan Union Of Economists. Baku: Elm, 2022. 319-328 pp.
21. Member of the scientific committee - “Green Economy” Green Business, Green Management, and Leadership: The Road to a Grenn Economy, New Challenges, Opportunities and Perspectives”. 10 th International Conference on Leadership, Technology, Innovation and Business Management 2022 (ICLTIBM-2022). Azerbaijan State University of Economics, Yıldız Technical University. Baku: October 12–14, 2022.
22. Member of the organizing committee and scientific committee. The First international scientific-practical virtual conference in Modern & social sciences: new nimensions, approaches and challenges. 08-09. July 2022. MTÜ. Estonia, Tallinn. 2022.
23. Member of the organizing committee and scientific committee. International conference “Green energy: a new conceptual vision and multiplier effects” dedicated to the 100th anniversary of the national leader Heydar Aliyev. Organized by the Center for Energy Economics of the Azerbaijan State University of Economics, the “Education and Investment Support Fund” (Georgia, Tbilisi) and the “International Center for Research, Education and Training” (Estonia, Tallinn) on the basis of joint participation. April 28–29, 2023, Baku-Tbilisi-Tallinn. 2023
24. Member of the advisory committee - “Technological, economic and social aspects of energy 1st International Energy congress”. March 16–18, 2023, Istanbul, Turkey. 2023.
25. Member of the organizing committee and scientific committee. International conference “Green energy: a new conceptual vision and multiplier effects” dedicated to the 100th anniversary of the national leader Heydar Aliyev. Organized by the Center for Energy Economics of the Azerbaijan State University of Economics, the “Education and Investment Support Fund” (Georgia, Tbilisi) and the “International Center for Research, Education and Training” (Estonia, Tallinn) on the basis of joint participation. April 28-29, 2023, Baku-Tbilisi-Tallinn. 2023
26. Member of the editorial board. Mammadov M.A. “Ilham Aliyev's strategy of the economic development of territories freed from occupation” (monograph). Baku: Elm, 2024. 452 s. Editorial board.
27. Reviewer. Abbasov Anar Fazil oglu. Modern trends in economic development: global challenges, threats and prospects. Monograph. Baku: 2024, “Muellim” publishing house, 576 p.
28. Member of the editorial board. Asia of The Future. International Journal of The Asian Academy of Sciences. 2024.
29. Members of Scientific Committee. International Multidisciplinary Symposium “UN-COP29: Strengthening the role of world scientists in solving pressing problems of modern civilization. Environmental protection and the green agenda”. Baku:August 31, 2024.
30. Member of the Advisory Committee - “The Approaching Meta-Crisis in Global Energy Consumption: Artificial Intelligence and Data Farms”. 3rd International Energy Congress. December 18–19, 2025, Istanbul, Turkey.
31. Member of the editorial board.“International Journal of Economy, Energy and Environment”. US New York. December 2, 2025.
32. Member of the Advisory Committee - “The Approaching Meta-Crisis in Global Energy Consumption: Artificial Intelligence and Data Farms”. 3rd International Energy Congress. December 18-19, 2025, Istanbul, Turkey.
33. Mahmudov A.A. “Actual problems of the economy of Azerbaijan”. In two volumes. Baku: publishing House “Sharq-Karb”, 2013. (member of the editorial board).
34. Hasanov N.A. “Modern problems of implementation of investment projects” (Monography). Baku: “University of Economics” Publishing House (UNEC). 2026. 164 p.
35. Scientific editor. Karimov R.I. “National economic development: new driving forces” (Monography). Baku: “UNEC” Publishing House, 2026. 270 p.
36. Member of the Editorial Board of the Asian Academy of Sciences “White Paper”.

== Awards ==
1. Jubilee medal “100 years of Heydar Aliyev (1923-2023)” (Order of the President of the Republic of Azerbaijan № 4289 from February 2, 2024).
2. “Taraqqi” medal (Progress). (Order of the President of the Republic of Azerbaijan №2702 from June 23, 2021).
3. Jubilee medal of the 100 th anniversary of the Azerbaijan Democratic Republic (1918-2018) (By the Order No. 1205 of the President of the Republic of Azerbaijan dated May 27, 2019).(Order of the President of the Republic of Azerbaijan № 1205 from May 27, 2019).
4. Jubilee Medal "25th anniversary of the demining Agency of the Republic of Azerbaijan (1998-2023)" (Order of the chairman of the Board of the demining Agency of the Republic of Azerbaijan No. 11-7/3-12400Ü/2023. 20.12.2023).
5. Jubilee Medal of the Republic of Azerbaijan “30th Anniversary of the Constitution of the Republic of Azerbaijan (1995-2025)”(Order № C-39 of the Chairman of the Constitutional Court of the Republic of Azerbaijan dated December 22, 2025 - Identity Card №.I-090)
6. “Gold badge” of the International Academy of Sciences. (“For exceptional services in the field of Science and Education” - Diploma FedEx 30Az/2022 Baku: 18.06.2022).

== Filmography ==
1. "Way of the father" (film, 2013).
