= Hajibey Sultanov =

- Born: September 20, 1921; Şağan, near Baku, Azerbaijan SSR
- Died: March 5, 2008 (aged 86); Baku, Azerbaijan
- Education: Baku State University
- Awards: Shohrat Order
- Scientific career
- Fields: astronomy, celestial mechanics
- Workplaces: Institute of Physics and Mathematics (Academy of Sciences of the Azerbaijan SSR); Shamakhi Astrophysical Observatory

Hajibey Farajulla oglu Sultanov (Azerbaijani: Hacıbəy Fərəculla oğlu Sultanov, 20 September 1921 – 5 March 2008) was an Azerbaijani astronomer and former head of the Shamakhy Astrophysical Observatory. Sultanov's main works tackle celestial mechanics and the genesis of the Solar System, as well as the origin, structure, and evolution of the asteroid belt and minor planets. Sultanov was a member of the International Astronomical Union and European Astronomical Society.

== Early life ==
Sultanov graduated from the faculty of physics and mathematics at the Baku State University in 1942 and fought on the Eastern Front of World War II. For his military service, Sultanov was awarded the Order of the Patriotic War, and medals For Courage, For the Defence of the Caucasus, For the Liberation of Prague and For the Victory over Germany in the Great Patriotic War 1941–1945.

== Academia ==
Having demobilized from the military in 1946, Sultanov began his scientific work in the Baku State University and completed postgraduate studies. Sultanov initially worked in the Institute of Physics and Mathematics of the Academy of Sciences of the Azerbaijan SSR. From 1953, Sultanov managed the planning and construction of the telescope at the Shamakhi Astrophysical Observatory. In 1953, he became the head of the newly established Astrophysics Department at that academy. In 1976–81, Sultanov was the vice president of the Academy of Sciences of the Azerbaijan SSR. Sultanov was also the head of the Shamakhi Astrophysical Observatory. Sultanov developed the hypothesis that a ring of minor planets formed as a result of successive disintegrations of few larger primary bodies that emerged at the beginning of the evolution of protoplanetary material. In 2004, Sultanov was awarded Shohrat Order for the advancement of Azerbaijani science.

Sultanov died during a fire in the administrative building of the Shamakhi Observatory in Baku on March 5, 2008.
