= Azerspace-1/Africasat-1a =

Azerbaijani communications satellite

Azerspace-1/Africasat-a
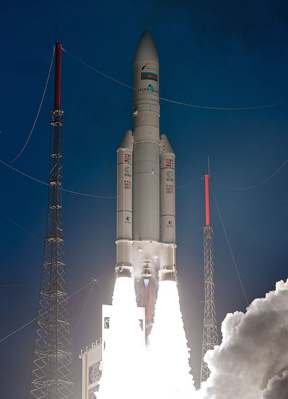
- Mission type: Communications
- Operator: Azercosmos
- COSPAR ID: 2013-006B
- SATCAT no.: 39079
- Mission duration: 15 years

Spacecraft properties
- Bus: GEOStar-2
- Manufacturer: Orbital Sciences Corporation
- Launch mass: 3,275 kilograms (7,220 lb)

Start of mission
- Launch date: February 8, 2013, 21:37 UTC
- Rocket: Ariane 5ECA VA212
- Launch site: Kourou ELA-3
- Contractor: Arianespace

Orbital parameters
- Reference system: Geocentric
- Regime: Geostationary
- Perigee altitude: 35,781 kilometres (22,233 mi)
- Apogee altitude: 35,802 kilometres (22,246 mi)
- Inclination: 0.03 degrees
- Period: 1,436.05 minutes
- Epoch: 29 October 2013, 20:36:34 UTC

Transponders
- Band: 12 Ku-band transponders 24 C-band transponders
- Coverage area: Europe, Central Asia (Ku-band and C-band); Africa (C-band only)

Azerspace-1/Africasat-1a', is Azerbaijan's first satellite in space. Built by Orbital Sciences Corporation, it was launched by Ariane 5 into orbit on February 7, 2013 from Kourou in French Guiana at orbital positions 46° east. The satellite covers Europe and a significant part of Asia and Africa. It is operated by the Azerbaijani company Azercosmos and has transmission capabilities for TV, radio broadcasting and the internet.

The satellite has an anticipated service life of 15 years.

== Cost ==
It is believed that the satellite cost of US$ 120 million and was established by Orbital Sciences Corporation. Arianespace's president Jean-Yves Le Gall emphasized that the weight of the satellite would be three tonnes. In April 2011, Export-Import Bank of the United States has approved financing of this project as 85 per cent of construction cost which will be provided to the Azerbaijani side in the form of a loan, while the remaining 15 per cent will be paid by state funds. The funds will be issued to Azercosmos OJSC.

== Satellite specifications ==
The satellite has solar arrays with four panels per array, using UTJ Gallium Arsenide cells. It will be stabilized with a 3-axis stabilized, zero momentum system. It will have a liquid bi-propellant transfer orbit system, with a monopropellant (hydrazine) on-orbit system. Power will be held in two Li-ion batteries with a capacity of >4840 W/hr.

Azerspace-1/Africasat-1A has a hybrid payload including both C- band and Ku-band antennae. There will be 24 active C-band transponders, using a 2.5 m × 2.7 m (8 ft 2 in × 8 ft 10 in) single shell super-elliptical deployable reflector, with a 1.4 m × 1.4 m (4 ft 7 in × 4 ft 7 in) single shell super-elliptical deck-mounted reflector. There will also be 12 active Ku-band transponders, using a 2.5 m × 2.7 m (8 ft 2 in × 8 ft 10 in) single shell super-elliptical deployable reflector.

The Ku-band transponders (11.2 GHz and 14.0 GHz) have a contour map that primarily covers Europe and Central Asia. The C-band contour map (3740 MHz and 5965 MHz) also covers Europe and Central Asia, as well as nearly all of Africa.

== Orbit ==
The satellite based on Orbital's flight-proven STAR-2 platform and generates approximately five kilowatts of payload power for 36 active transponders. Upon completion of in-orbit testing, operational control of the satellite was handed over to Azerbaijan's Ministry of Communications and IT, and since October, 2017 Azercosmos OJSCo controls Azerspace-1 independently.

== Operation ==
The satellite's operations are controlled by a state-run company, Azercosmos, owned by the Government of Azerbaijan Azerspace-1/Africasat-1A is a joint venture between Azerbaijan and satellite fleet operator MEASAT Satellite Systems of Malaysia, which owns the rights to the orbital slot at 46 degrees east longitude, and which will be using about 40 per cent of the satellite's total capacity. Azerbaijan uses 20 per cent, with the remaining capacity to be available for other customers.

As of 2014, satellite carries 13 radio stations and 128 television channels, mostly free to air, in addition to its services to the government. As of 2018, the satellite carries around 100 TV and radio channels, mostly free to air, in addition to its services to the government.

== Follow-on activities ==
The launch of its own satellite inaugurated Azerbaijan's space industry. In April 2011, deputy director of the Azerbaijan National Aerospace Agency Tofig Suleymanov hinted that Azerbaijan had plans to launch a second satellite to study the Earth's interior and atmosphere in 2014. On 26 November 2011, the head of Azercosmos, Rashad Nabiyev, reported that the launch of the second satellite was expected to occur in 2015.

Azercosmos was launched second telecommunication satellite, Azerspace-2, in 25 September 2018 by 22:38 by UTC, to provide broadband and broadcast services to customers in Europe, the Middle East, Sub-Saharan Africa, and Central and South Asia. The new satellite is equipped with 35 transponders in Ku-band, and will be located at 45° East longitude. The lifespan of Azerspace-2 is expected to be 15 years.

== See also ==
- Azerbaijan National Aerospace Agency
