= Azerspace-2 =

Telecommunications satellite

- Names: Intelsat 38
- Mission type: Communications
- Operator: Azercosmos; Intelsat
- COSPAR ID: 2018-074A
- SATCAT no.: 43632
- Mission duration: 15 years (planned)

Spacecraft properties
- Spacecraft: Azerspace-2
- Spacecraft type: SSL 1300
- Bus: LS 1300
- Manufacturer: Space Systems/Loral
- Launch mass: 3,500 kg (7,700 lb)
- Power: 13.7 kW

Start of mission
- Launch date: 26 September 2018, 02:38 GMT+4
- Rocket: Ariane 5 ECA (VA243)
- Launch site: Centre Spatial Guyanais, ELA-3
- Contractor: Arianespace

Orbital parameters
- Reference system: Geocentric orbit
- Regime: Geostationary orbit
- Longitude: 45° East

Transponders
- Band: 35 Ku-band transponders
- Coverage area: Central Europe, Eastern Europe, Sub-Saharan Africa, Middle East, Asia

Azerspace-2, also known as Intelsat 38, is Azerbaijan's second telecommunications satellite, built by Space Systems/Loral, California and managed by Azercosmos and Intelsat.

== History ==
A strategic agreement was signed between the Intelsat S.A., and Azercosmos OJSCo. (Azercosmos Open Joint Stock Company), Azerbaijan's national satellite operator, on the 45° East orbital location in February 2015. Both companies collaborated on the development of the Azerpsace-2 satellite. The purchase of Azerspace-2 is carried out mainly at the expense of a preferential loan from the Canadian credit and export agency Export Development Canada.

== Launch ==
Azerpsace-2 satellite was launched into orbit on 26 September 2018 at 02:38 GMT+4 from the centre Spatial Guyanais in French Guiana. It separated from the upper rocket stage and operated in test mode for the first two months. Then the satellite was transferred to a working orbit. Azerspace-2 has been designed in order to help Azercosmos to expand its service area. It renders uninterrupted service across Central Europe, Eastern Europe, Asia, the Middle East and Sub-Saharan Africa. The new satellite will provide continuity of service for the Intelsat 12 satellite.

== Satellite description ==
Azerspace-2 will provide digital broadcasting, data transmission and other services. The satellite will support the direct-to-home (DTH) satellite broadcasting, contributing to the emergence of DTH operators in Azerbaijan. It has an anticipated service life of 15 years.

== Orbit longitude ==
The satellite was placed into geostationary orbit at 45° East longitude, and will serve the countries of Central and Eastern Europe, Sub-Saharan Africa, the Middle East and Asia, also serving as a backup to Azerspace-1.

== Commercialization ==
According to Azercosmos, 46% of the satellite's unladen capacity has been sold.
