= Luigi Tomasini =

Italian violinist and composer (1741–1808)

Luigi Tomasini (or Alois Luigi Tomasini; 22 June 1741 – 25 April 1808) was an Italian violinist and composer. He was leader of Prince Esterházy's court orchestra, which was directed by Joseph Haydn.

== Life ==
Tomasini was born in Pesaro, Italy, in 1741. Discovered by Paul II Anton, Prince Esterházy, who was interested in music, he was engaged in 1757 as a servant; he was given musical training, and became a violinist in the prince's orchestra at his court in Eisenstadt.

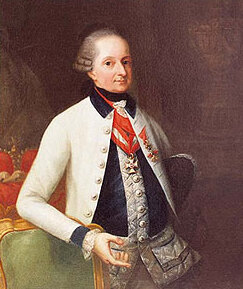
Prince Nikolaus I, Tomasini's employer from 1762 to 1790

Joseph Haydn became the director of the prince's orchestra in 1761, and Tomasini became konzertmeister. The orchestra continued under the prince's successor, his brother Nikolaus I, from 1762. Haydn wrote violin concerti for Tomasini.

Nikolaus died in 1790 and was succeeded by his son, Prince Anton, who was less interested in music. Tomasini received a pension and was given a chance to tour. Nikolaus II succeeded his father Anton in 1794 and revived the orchestra; in 1802 Tomasini became director of chamber music for Nikolaus II.

Tomasini married Josepha Vogl, and they had twelve children; four of them became court musicians at Esterházy.

== Works ==
Tomasini composed about 30 string quartets, a few symphonies and violin concerti, violin sonatas and violin duos, and many baryton trios (written for Prince Nikolaus I, a baryton player).
