= Andreas Lidel =

Andreas Lidel (Liedl, Lidl) (c. 1740, Austria - c. 1789, London, England), composer and virtuoso performer on the baryton (viola di bardone) and viola da gamba. From 1769 to 1774 he was in service at the court of the Prince Nikolaus Esterházy where he might have studied composition with Joseph Haydn. By 1778 Lidel had settled in London. His printed compositions include mostly chamber music for string instruments (duos, trios, quartets, quintets, etc.) in the Viennese classical style. Schubart praised Lidel as the inventor (which was not true) and the most perfect virtuoso of baryton.
