= Anton I =

Anton I may refer to:

- Anton I of Georgia (1720–1788), Catholicos-Patriarch of Georgia
- Anton I, Prince Esterházy (1738–1794), Hungarian prince
