= Baryton trios (Haydn) =

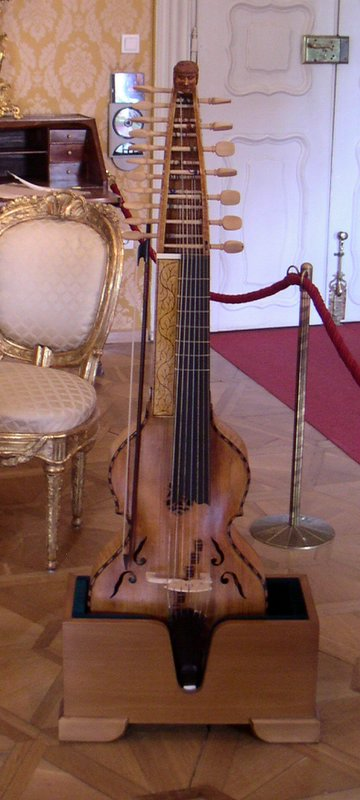
A copy of Prince Esterházy's baryton, on display at his palace in Eisenstadt.

Joseph Haydn wrote 123 trios for the unusual combination of baryton, viola and cello. Three further trios for baryton, cello and violin (Hob. XI:89-91) are considered part of the series. As Sisman notes, they are the “most intensively cultivated genre” of Haydn’s early career.

== The baryton ==
The baryton is a bowed string instrument of the viol family played in Europe during the 17th and 18th centuries. It has six or seven strings of gut, arranged over a fretted fingerboard, plus a lower set of wire strings. When the gut strings are bowed, the wire strings vibrate sympathetically, enriching the tone. The wire strings may also be plucked by the performer's left thumb, creating a contrasting tonal quality.

== History ==
Haydn began composing baryton trios in 1765. At the time he had been working for the princes of the Esterházy family since 1761, and since 1762 for the newly reigning Prince Nikolaus. Nikolaus had previously played the viola da gamba (an instrument similar to the baryton, but without the sympathetic strings), but in 1765 he purchased a baryton. In the same year, Haydn received an official reprimand from the prince for neglecting his duties; for details of this episode see Gregor Werner. An addendum to the reprimand specified that Haydn should also spend more time composing works for the Prince's new instrument:

"Finally, said Capelmeister Haydn is urgently enjoined to apply himself to compositions more diligently than heretofore, and especially to write such pieces as can be played on the gamba [i.e., baryton], of which pieces we have seen very few up to now; and to be able to judge his diligence, he shall at times send us the first copy, cleanly and carefully written, of each and every composition."

Haydn responded vigorously to this command, and his efforts soon met with the Prince's approval. On 4 January 1766, Esterházy wrote to his administrator:

"I have this moment received from Hayden [sic] three pieces which please me very much. You are accordingly to pay him in my name twelve ducats from the treasury and to tell him at the same time that he is to write six more pieces like those he has just sent me, together with two solos, to be delivered as soon as possible."

These gratuities were to continue.

Over the next ten years Haydn wrote nearly 200 compositions for various ensembles with baryton. Of these, the predominant genre was the baryton trio. Whenever Haydn had completed 24 trios, he had the set "richly bound in leather and gold" (Sisman). The resulting volumes were dated 1766, 1767, 1768, 1771, and 1778; the last was bound up after the prince had abandoned the instrument in favor of a new hobby also involving Haydn, namely the mounting of opera productions in his palace. According to barytonist John Hsu, the last trios actually date from 1775.

== The music ==
=== Form ===
The trios, being written for amateur performance, are generally shorter and less ambitious than Haydn's more famous series of symphonies and string quartets. In almost all cases, they consist of just three movements. When there is a slow movement, it is usually the first movement and is followed by a second movement in fast tempo. The first movement can also be a fast-tempo work in sonata form, or sometimes a variation set. There is always a minuet, which is placed either as the middle movement or as the finale. Non-minuet finales are characteristically in fast tempo.

In general, the first and last movements are in the home key of the trio and the middle movement in a closely related key. Only two of the trios are in a minor key.

=== The role of the three instruments ===
John Hsu suggested that when the Prince played baryton trios, the viola part was taken by Haydn, and the cello part by whoever was the cellist in the Prince's orchestra at the time. In the music itself, the baryton part normally takes the melodic line. As Oliver Strunk wrote, the trios "are not chamber-music in the accepted sense of the word, but accompanied solos. Prince Nicholas was no democrat where music was concerned and cared little about sharing honors with the professional musicians who assisted him." Nevertheless, Strunk goes on to say that "in many movements the three parts are about equally interesting."

None of the three instruments has a soprano range, and the resulting dark timbre of the ensemble is unusual in chamber music. Sadie and Pamplin observe that the "baryton trio texture – baryton, viola and cello – was devised particularly for Nicolaus and, while born of exigency, it proved a stroke of genius. The bowed strings of the baryton blend with the viola and the cello, and the plucked strings provide a contrasting timbre. The overtones produced by the baryton's many strings compensate for the absence of a treble instrument ... The overall effect mystifies the listener because the individual instruments are often impossible to differentiate." This confusion of voices is related to another observation by Strunk, that Haydn frequently has the instruments "cross ranges", with the lower-pitched cello playing higher than the baryton or the higher-pitched viola playing lower than it.

=== Stylistic evolution ===
Jones notes changes in the style of the trios over time. In part, these simply reflect the expanding ability of Prince Esterházy to play an instrument that initially was new to him. Thus, in the early trios the predominant key employed is A major, evidently the easiest in which to play; later works explore a broader range of keys. By the third volume of trios, the Prince was evidently able to pluck and bow simultaneously, a task demanded in Nos. 60 and 66; and to alternate rapidly between plucking and bowing (e.g. no. 69).

The time when the trios were composed (1765-1775) was an important period of evolution in Haydn's style, including the so-called "Sturm und Drang" period that included works such as the "Farewell Symphony" and the C-minor keyboard sonata of 1772. Haydn was also busy composing a series of 18 string quartets (opp. 9, 17 and 20) that established his reputation as founder and master of this genre. The baryton trios, though smaller in scope, echo the stylistic evolution of this period, increasing in subtlety and interest over time.

=== Musical quotations ===
The trios occasionally borrow material from earlier works, mostly by Haydn himself.

- The first movement of Trio 5 is based on the aria "Che farò senza Euridice," from Gluck's opera Orfeo ed Euridice.
- The first movement of Trio 29 is based on the opening aria, "Che visino delicato", from Haydn's own opera La Canterina.
- The first movement of Trio 37 is a transcription of a movement from the keyboard sonata H. XVI:3.
- Trio 52 borrows its minuet movement, marked Menuet alla zoppa, from the 58th symphony. The key is transposed up a third.
- Trio 64 employs a Gregorian chant for Easter, the same as that used (in a different way) in the earlier 30th Symphony.
- Trio 102 borrows material from the earlier keyboard trio H. XV:2 in F.
- Trio 110 borrows material from an earlier divertimento in C for keyboard, two violins and cello H. XIV:8

Likewise, material from the trios appears in later Haydn works:

- The variation theme of Trio 38 is found in a different form in the keyboard variations for four hands, "Il maestro e lo scolare" H. XVIIa:I.

== Prince Esterházy's baryton ==
The Prince's instrument was built in 1750 by Johann Joseph Stadlmann of Vienna, a famed violin maker who later did business regularly with the Esterházy musical establishment. This baryton had seven bowed strings, tuned like a bass viola da gamba (to which the sound of the bowed baryton strings is comparable); i.e. A', D, G, c, e, a, d'. There were ten wire strings, tuned in a D-major scale, plus the A a fourth below and the E a major second above. (Since Haydn's baryton works dominate modern performance on the baryton, it is this form of the instrument that is most often constructed today.) The instrument has been described as follows: it "is made of pine and maple and lacquered in light yellow. The sides and the back are decorated with undulating lines of inlay; on its extra fingerboard there is a foliated scroll inlay of bone and wood. The peg-box ends in a carved, painted moustachiod head wearing a shako. The original case is covered with leather studding with gilded nails."

John Hsu estimated that the Prince was probably not a virtuoso on his instrument, judging from the difficulty of Haydn's writing. The composer used only the top five of the seven bowed strings, and seldom required the player to pluck and bow simultaneously. The keys chosen are also the simplest to play in: D major and the neighboring keys of G major and A major.

According to Pamplin, the tuning of the wire strings on the Prince's baryton was a special one, not typical of the baryton tradition as a whole but reflecting the particular needs of the music written by Haydn (and various of his colleagues) for Prince Esterházy. In most barytons, the wire strings were often tuned in the range of the three lowest bowed strings. As such, they were used to provide a bass line underneath a bowed melody in solo playing. Haydn seldom wrote such music (which is quite demanding for the player), thus respecting the needs of his amateur patron. The wire strings of the Prince's instrument were instead tuned in the same range as the highest three bowed strings. Through sympathetic vibration, they enhanced the timbre of the melody line, thus serving the baryton's role as the primary melody instrument in this music.

Prince Esterházy's instrument was kept in the family's collections after his death. Much later (1949), it became the property of the (then-communist) Hungarian government when, on coming to power, it confiscated the Esterházy estates and installed the instrument in the Hungarian National Museum in Budapest, where it may be viewed today.

== Critical opinion ==
A relatively negative assessment of the baryton trios is offered by David Wyn Jones, who writes that they "could be written on automatic pilot (though one prone to creative computer error)." Referring to Prince Esterházy's command to compose the music (from the 1765 reprimand document described above), Jones comments, "Very few people played the [baryton] and this command from the prince must rank as one of the most indulgently self-interested in the history of musical patronage." Other Haydn scholars tend to be more positive; while generally acknowledging the limited scale and aspirations of the trios, they express admiration for Haydn's craft in composing them. Thus, James Webster: "the baryton trios ... are finely wrought compositions, as rewarding in their way as the raw expressionism of the Sturm und Drang"; Karl Geiringer: "A number of fine specimens are to be found in this collection, showing that Haydn gave of his best even when he did not expect his compositions to be heard outside the court of his prince"; Lucy Robinson: "Despite the limitations of the combination, Haydn's genius is evident in the kaleidoscopic range of melodic and textural ideas and the witty interplay between instruments."

John Hsu wrote (1986), "Throughout the trios, there is a feeling of intimacy. This is the most private of chamber music, written especially in response to the wishes and needs of one person. We can easily imagine the satisfaction and inspiration which Prince Esterházy experienced while playing these trios."
