= Franz Nikolaus Novotny =

Austrian organist and composer

Franz Nikolaus Novotny (also Novotný, Novittni, Novotni, Nowotny) (6 December 1743, Eisenstadt, Kingdom of Hungary – 25 August 1773) was an Austrian organist and composer of Bohemian descent at the Esterházy court in Schloss Esterházy in Eisenstadt.

Novotny's grandfather had served at the court as a bass singer; his father, Johann Novotný (1718–1765), a pupil of Gregor Werner, was also a court organist. Franz Nikolaus succeeded his father in that post on 30 August 1765, having before worked in the court treasury. He composed mainly church music and his work was esteemed by Joseph Haydn.

== Recordings ==
- "Prelude in G major", "Prelude in D minor", on Historical Organs in Hungary (Gábor Lehotka, István Baróti)

== Bibliography ==
- Franz Nikolaus Novotny: Small Preludes for Organ, ed. Erich Benedikt, Ludwig Doblinger (Munich, 2009)
- Milan Poštolka: Joseph Haydn a naše hudba 18. století (Joseph Haydn and 18th-century Czech music) (Prague, 1961)
- Ulrich Tank: Studien zur Esterházyschen Hofmusik von etwa 1620 bis 1790 (Regensburg, 1981) ISBN 3-7649-2197-8
