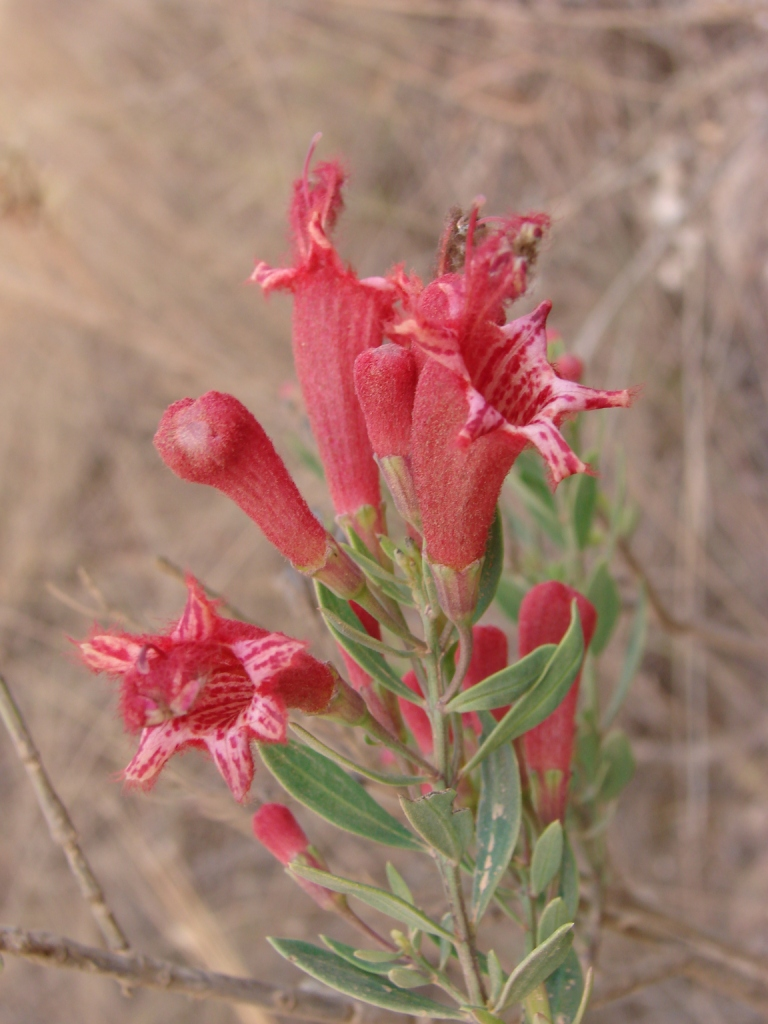

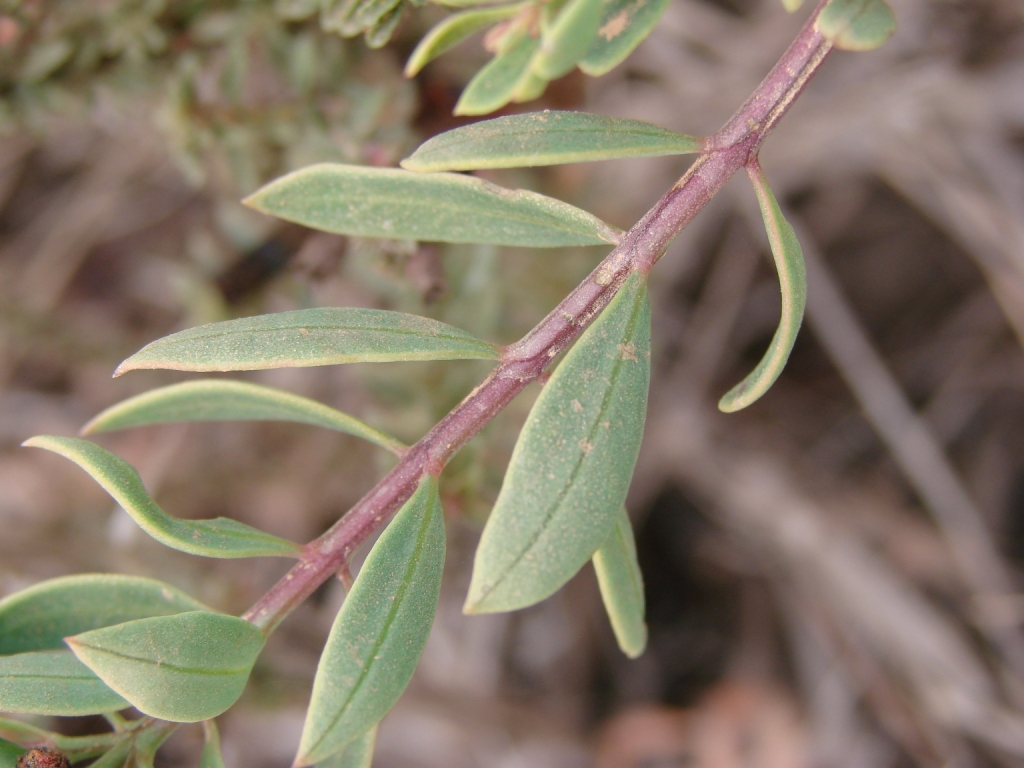
- Close-up of leaves

Scientific classification
- Kingdom: Plantae
- Clade: Tracheophytes
- Clade: Angiosperms
- Clade: Eudicots
- Clade: Asterids
- Order: Lamiales
- Family: Orobanchaceae
- Genus: Esterhazya
- Species: E. nanuzae

Binomial name
- Esterhazya nanuzae V.C.Souza

= Esterhazya nanuzae =

Species of flowering plant in the broomrape family

Esterhazya nanuzae is a species of parasitic flowering plant in the Orobanchaceae family. It is native and endemic to Southeast Brazil, specifically the state of Minas Gerais.

== Description ==
A root-specific hemiparasitic subshrub or shrub, as evidenced by the existence of haustoria, which are modifications of the same organs. Additionally, the habit is upright and 1–1.7 meters (3.3–5.6 ft) tall. Usually simply or slightly branched.

Leaves are arranged oppositely, subsessile, with an elliptic, rarely elliptic-lanceolate shape, appreased to the stem and lacking hairs.

Calyx is glabrous like the leaves, with as rounded and apiculate lobes.

Corolla is salmon, between orange and red in hue, with glabrous to slightly pubescent outer tubes and nearly circular lobes.

The fruit is a capsule that contains multiple endospermic seeds.
