= Esterhazya =

Scientific classification
- Kingdom: Plantae
- Clade: Tracheophytes
- Clade: Angiosperms
- Clade: Eudicots
- Clade: Asterids
- Order: Lamiales
- Family: Orobanchaceae
- Genus: Esterhazya; J.C.Mikan

Genus of plants

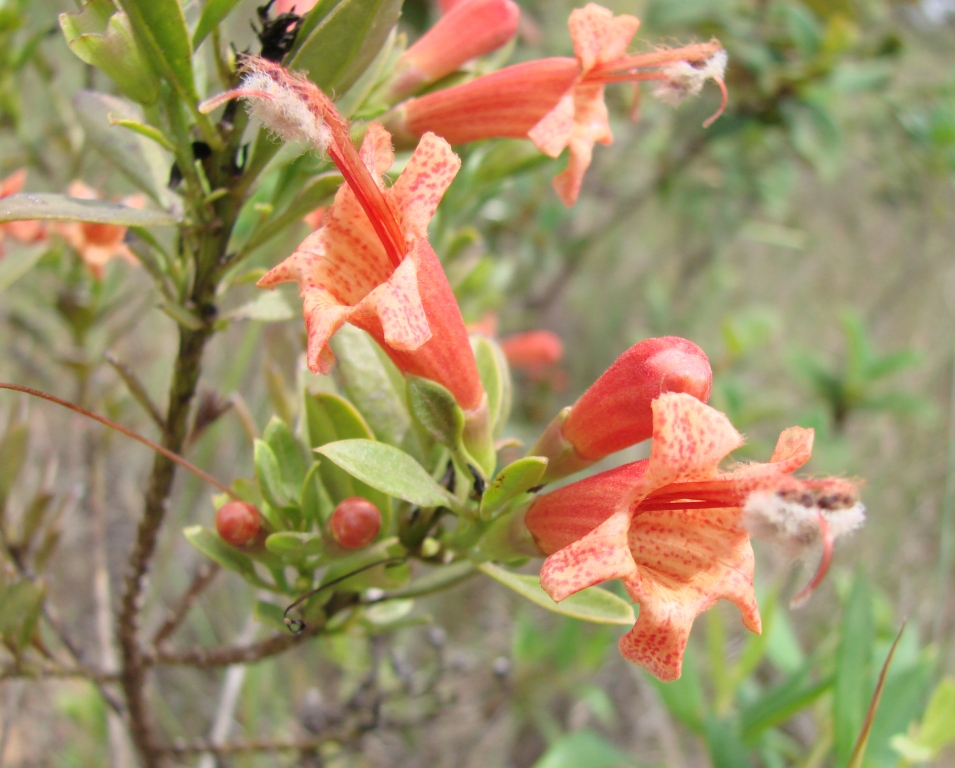
Esterhazya macrodonta

Esterhazya is a genus of flowering plants belonging to the family Orobanchaceae.

It is native to Bolivia, Brazil and Paraguay.

Its genus name of Esterhazya is in honour of Hungarian Nikolaus II, Prince Esterházy (1765–1833), and it was first published and described in Del. Fl. Faun. Bras. on table 5 in 1820.

Known species:

- Esterhazya caesarea (Cham. & Schltdl.) V.C.Souza
- Esterhazya eitenorum Barringer
- Esterhazya macrodonta (Cham.) Benth.
- Esterhazya nanuzae V.C.Souza
- Esterhazya splendida J.C.Mikan
- Esterhazya triflora R.B.Moura & R.J.V.Alves
