= Nikolaus I, Prince Esterházy =

Hungarian prince

Nikolaus I
- 5th Prince Esterházy of Galántha
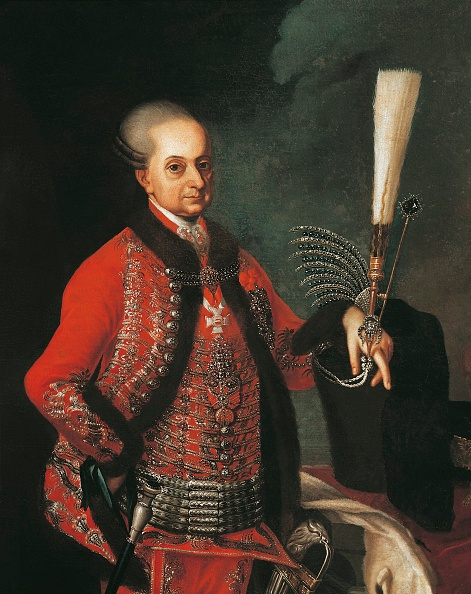
- The Prince in the uniform of his Hungarian Infantry Regiment, wearing the insignia of the Military Order of Maria Theresa (portrait by unknown artist, c. 1770)

Prince Esterházy of Galántha
- Reign: 7 March 1762 – 28 September 1790
- Predecessor: Paul II Anton
- Successor: Anton I
- Born: Graf Nikolaus Josef Esterházy von Galántha; 18 December 1714; Vienna, Austria, Holy Roman Empire
- Died: September 28, 1790 (aged 75); Eisenstadt, Kingdom of Hungary
- Buried: Franziskanerkirche, Kismarton (Eisenstadt)
- Noble family: Esterházy
- Spouse: Marie Elisabeth Ungnad von Weißenwolff
- Issue: Anton I, Prince Esterházy; Maria Anna Esterházy; Josef Esterházy
- Father: Joseph I, Prince Esterházy
- Mother: Maria Octavia von Gilleis
- Military career
- Allegiance: Habsburg monarchy
- Branch: Imperial Army
- Rank: Generalfeldmarschall
- Unit: Infantry Regiment No. 33
- Commands: Hungarian Noble Guard (Captain)
- Conflicts: War of the Austrian Succession; Seven Years' War; Battle of Kolín; War of the Bavarian Succession
- Awards: Order of the Golden Fleece; Military Order of Maria Theresa; Order of Saint Stephen of Hungary

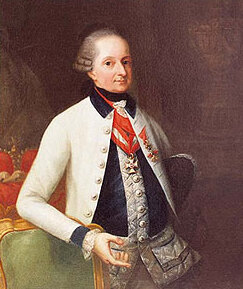

Nikolaus I, Prince Esterházy (Hungarian: Esterházy I. Miklós, German: Nikolaus I. Joseph Fürst Esterhazy; 18 December 1714 – 28 September 1790) was a Hungarian prince, a member of the famous Esterházy family. His building of palaces, extravagant clothing, and taste for opera and other grand musical productions led to his being given the title "the Magnificent". He is remembered as the principal employer of the composer Joseph Haydn.

== Life ==
Nikolaus Esterházy was the son of Prince Joseph (József Simon Antal, 1688–1721), and the younger brother of Prince Paul Anton (Pál Antal, 1711–1762). He took the title of Prince on his brother's death.

His name is given in various languages: German (the language of the Habsburg Court) "Nikolaus Josef", Hungarian (probably his native language) "Miklós József," and (in English contexts) the English form of his name, "Nicholas".

In early life he was educated by Jesuits. He became a military officer, serving the Austrian Empire. Of his military career, Robbins Landon notes that he achieved, "considerable distinction, particularly as Colonel at the Battle of Kolin (1757) in the Seven Years' War where, with great personal courage, he led the wavering cavalry troops to victory. He was later made a Lieutenant Field-Marshal." Subsequently he became one of the original members of the Order of Maria Theresa. In 1762 he was appointed captain of Maria Theresa's Hungarian bodyguard, in 1764 Feldzeugmeister, and in 1768 field marshal. His other honours included the Golden Fleece and the grade of commander in the Order of Maria Theresa.

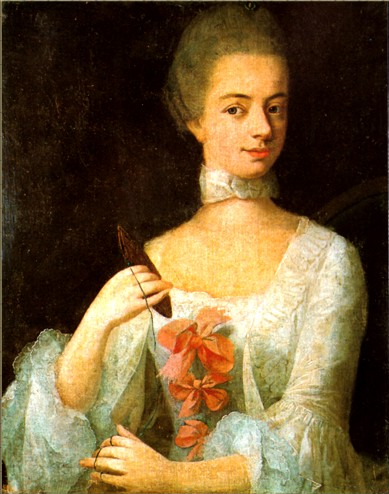
Prince Nikolaus's wife, Marie Elisabeth Ungnad von Weißenwolff.

Robbins Landon narrates Nikolaus's marriage thus: "On 4 March 1737, he married Freiin Marie Elisabeth, daughter of Reichsgraf (Count of the Holy Roman Empire) Ferdinand von Weissenwolf". His son Anton I, Prince Esterházy became the father of Nikolaus II, Prince Esterházy, patron of well known musicians and composers.

During the period before his brother Paul Anton's death, Nikolaus held the title of Count. He generally lived apart from his brother, favoring a hunting lodge near the Neusiedlersee in Hungary. The brothers got along well, however, at least as can be determined from their correspondence.

Upon his brother's death in 1762, Paul Anton having had no children, Nikolaus inherited the title of Prince. Joseph II conferred the title of Prince, which had previously been limited to the eldest-born of the house, on all his descendants, male and female.

In 1766, Nikolaus began the construction of a magnificent new palace constructed at Eszterháza (now Fertőd), in rural Hungary on the site of his old hunting lodge. This is the most admired of the various Esterházy homes, is often called the "Hungarian Versailles," and is a tourist attraction today. The Prince at first spent only summers there, but gradually came to spend ten months of the year—much to the distress of his musicians; see the tale of the "Farewell" Symphony. Nikolaus evidently did not enjoy Vienna (where most of the Empire's landed aristocrats spent much of their time) and the time he spent away from Eszterháza was mostly at the old family seat in Eisenstadt.

Nikolaus had a very high income; according to some sources, he was richer than the Austrian Emperor. However, his expenses were also high, and on his death his son and successor Anton (Antal, 1738–1794) was forced to retrench financially.

== Personal characteristics ==
Nikolaus carried over habits he had acquired in the military to the administration of his household and lands. His chief administrator, Peter Ludwig von Rahier, was likewise a military man, and the highest ranking servants (including Joseph Haydn) were designated as "house officers" and ate at a special table provided for them.

The Prince insisted on honesty and exact adherence to procedure in his officials. At one point he issued "a detailed printed document to his subordinates, containing all manner of ... instructions and advice ('locks on granaries must be subject to checks'; 'officials must be polite'; 'intoxication is the greatest vice'; 'the bee-hives are to be counted'; 'officials must lead God-fearing lives')." In fact, his management style was successful, insofar as "by the time of his death in 1790, he had greatly increased the wealth of the family estates."

Nikolaus was extravagant in his clothing budget, and wore a famous jacket studded with diamonds. He was also "intensely musical" (Robbins Landon and Jones, 35), and he played the cello, the viola da gamba, and his favourite instrument, the difficult and now obscure baryton.

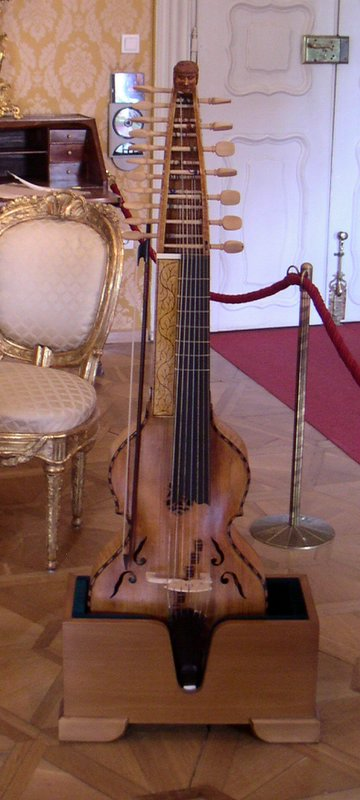
A modern copy of Nikolaus Esterházy's baryton

Goethe, who beheld Nikolaus in Frankfurt on a diplomatic mission during the coronation of Joseph II in 1764, described him as 'not tall, though well-formed, lively, and at the same time eminently decorous, without pride or coldness.'

== Benevolence and cruelty ==
The musicologist Karl Geiringer, in his biography of Haydn, records an interest on the Prince's part in the well-being of his musicians, maintaining a sort of social welfare program: "Prince Nicolaus often showed himself to be generous and kindhearted and by and large displayed a degree of social-mindedness uncommon at that time. He paid pensions to aged employees, and bestowed small sums on their widows. He supported a modest hospital in Eisenstadt and another in Eszterháza, which were available to the court employees. The medicines dispensed by the monastery of the Brothers of the Order of Mercy were, in most cases, paid for by the Prince. Any employee was entitled to consult one of the three physicians attached to the court, and, if the doctor so advised, an ailing servant was sent at the sovereign's expense to a spa to receive treatment." (Geiringer 1982, p. 54)

On the other hand, the writer on music Richard Wigmore addresses the Prince's treatment of his income source, namely the peasants who toiled on his domains; here, Prince Eszterházy is portrayed as the embodiment of harsh feudalism:

After visiting Eszterháza in 1784, the Swiss Baron Johann Kaspar Riesbeck marvelled in his Briefe einer reisenden Franzosen über Deutschland: "The castle is enormous and filled to bursting with luxurious objects. The garden contains everything that human fantasy can conceive to enhance, or if you will, undo the work of nature. Pavilions of all kinds stand like the dwellings of voluptuous fairies, and everything is to far removed from normal human activity that one looks upon it as if in the middle of a dream." He also observed that the palace gardens were surrounded by a wilderness 'where the people live like animals in underground caves or like Mongols in tents ... The clearest proof that a country is unhappy is the confrontation between the greatest magnificence and the most wretched poverty, and the greater the confrontation, the unhappier the country.' [Wigmore continues:] Prince Nicolaus enjoyed the exotic local colour provided by his singing, dancing serfs at Eszterháza entertainments. But reports confirm that he was one of the harshest of landlords, impervious to the reforms introduced by Maria Theresa to alleviate the lot of the peasantry.

== Nikolaus and Joseph Haydn ==
Nikolaus did not hire Haydn, but rather "inherited" him from his brother, who had hired him as Vice Kapellmeister in 1761. He was responsible for the promotion of Haydn to full Kapellmeister on the death of the old Kapellmeister, Gregor Werner, in 1766.

It is evident that, following a brief initial rough period (Haydn was reprimanded for negligence in 1765), the prince ultimately came to treasure Haydn. For instance, he frequently presented Haydn with gold ducats in praise of individual compositions, twice rebuilt Haydn's house when it burnt down (1768, 1776), and reversed a decision (1780) to dismiss the mediocre soprano Luigia Polzelli from the payroll when it became evident that Polzelli had become Haydn's mistress. Haydn was also allowed (1766) to retain another mediocre singer on the payroll, his younger brother Johann.

The official reprimand of 1765 included wording insisting that Haydn compose more works for the Prince's favorite instrument, the baryton. Haydn responded immediately, and in the period starting at this time and continuing into the mid-1770s wrote 126 baryton trios, as well as other works for the instrument. The baryton being quite obscure today, this music is not often played at present.

In his later life Nikolaus played much less, listening to ceaseless performances of operas produced by Haydn and his troupe both for the main theatre and for the marionette theatre at Esterhaza. Haydn wrote several of these operas himself (see List of operas by Joseph Haydn). These are likewise among his least remembered works.

There is no sign that Nikolaus had any real interest in Haydn's string quartets, now considered among his greatest works. However, there is one area of Haydn's œuvre where Nikolaus can be uncontroversially considered a great patron of musical arts, as he was the primary sponsor of Haydn's series of symphonies. Of the 106 symphonies, those following the series written for Count Morzin (Haydn's first employer) and for Paul Anton, and before the Paris symphonies of the late 1780s, were written specifically at Nikolaus's instigation. They were premiered by a small orchestra that Nikolaus provided to Haydn, giving the composer ample rehearsal time, salary levels to attract top personnel, and full artistic control. Few composers can ever have claimed to have possessed such an incubator for their creations, and the symphonies that Haydn wrote for this ensemble can fairly be regarded as Nikolaus's gift to posterity.

The orchestra maintained by the Prince was much smaller than modern symphony orchestras; in the 1760s it numbered only about 13–15. Later, particularly with the introduction of opera performances, the orchestra was expanded, reaching a peak of about 22–24.

A letter of Haydn's tells us that Nikolaus was disconsolate at the death (25 February 1790) of his wife, Princess Maria Elisabeth. The composer struggled to keep his employer's spirits up with music during the few months that he survived her.
