= Schloss Esterházy =

Palace in Eisenstadt, Austria

Coordinates: 47°50′55″N 16°31′15″E

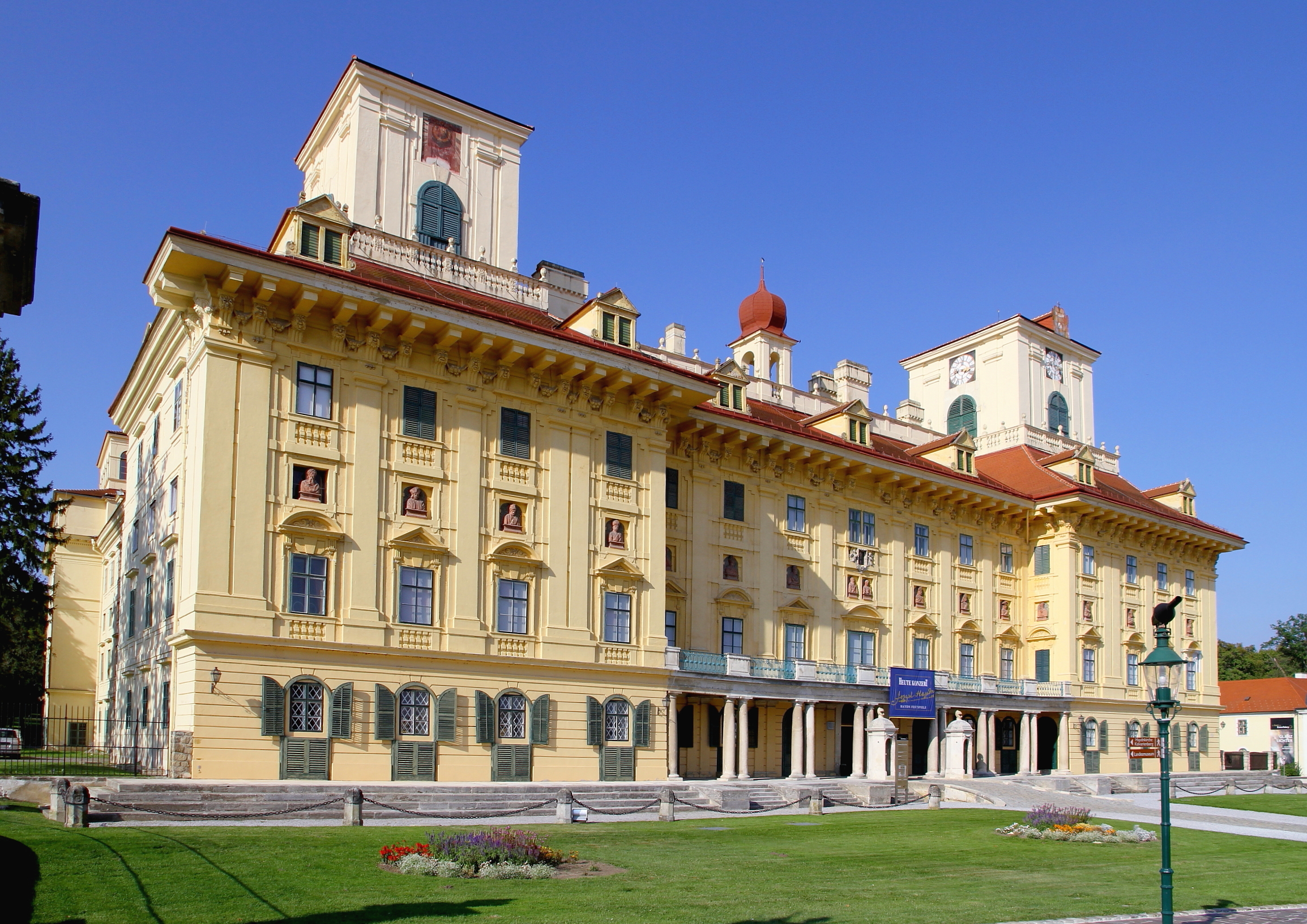
Schloss Esterházy in Eisenstadt, Austria

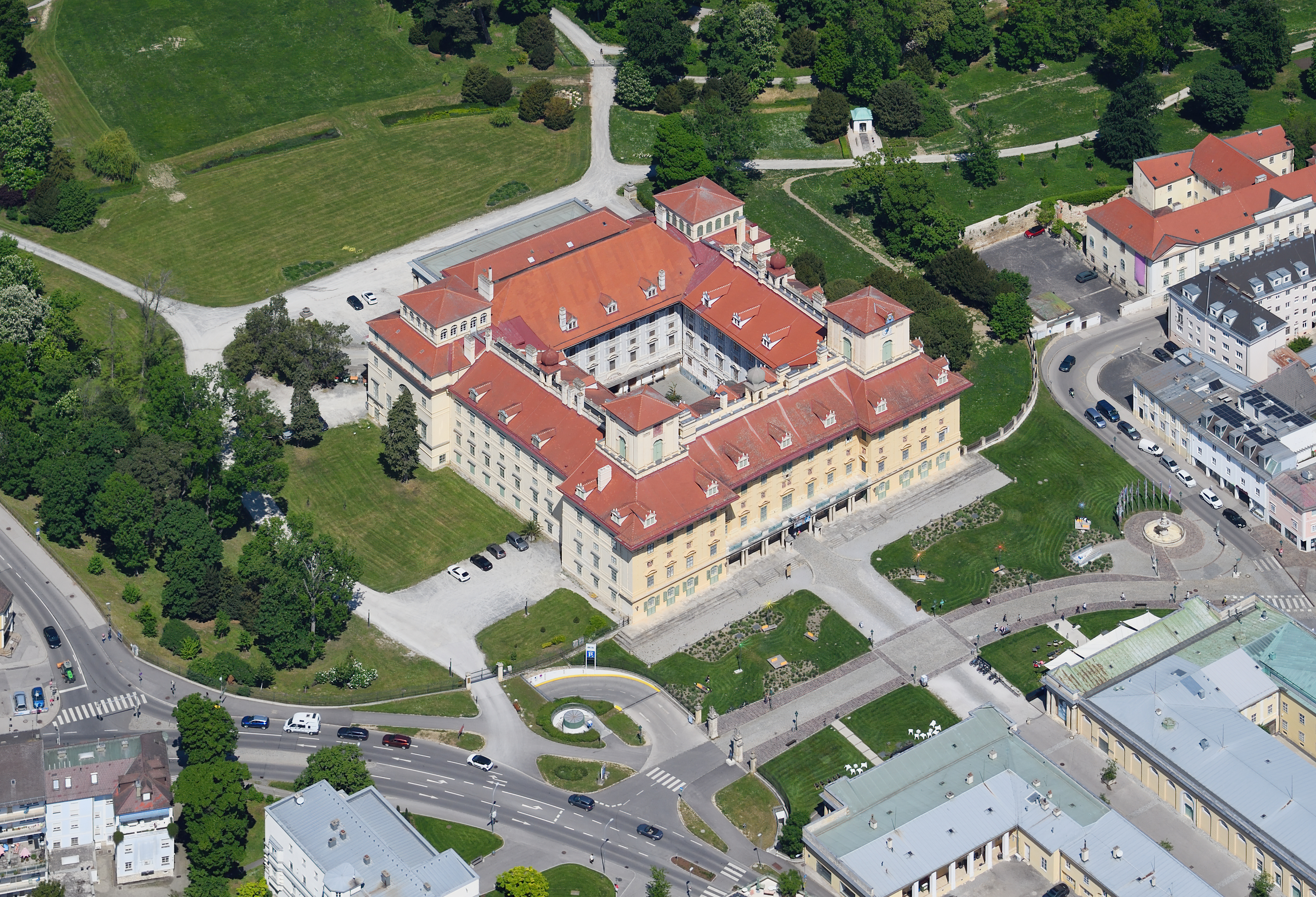
Aerial view. From upper left to lower right: part of the palace gardens, the palace itself, and the former Princely Stables and Main Guard House

Schloss Esterházy (Hungarian: Esterházy-kastély) is a palace in Eisenstadt, Austria, the capital of the Burgenland state. It was constructed in the late 13th century, and came under ownership of the Hungarian Esterházy family in 1622. Under Paul I, 1st Prince Esterházy of Galántha the estate was converted into a baroque castle which remained the principal residence and center of administration of the family for over 300 years. The famous composer Joseph Haydn worked here for most of his life.

== History ==
The architectural history of the building involves a transition from an actual medieval castle, built for defense, to a palace meant for comfort and ostentatious display. The moats were removed in the early 19th century, and the architectural style was modified at various points to fit the taste of the times.

=== Early period ===
1364: The palace comes into the possession of the powerful Kanizsai family and consequently experiences a substantial development.

1371: King Louis acquires and develops the castle into a "medieval city castle" included in the northwest perimeter of the city of Kismarton.

1622: Ownership falls under the possession of the Esterházy family.

=== Baroque building phase (1663–1672) ===
After the death of Count Ladislaus Esterházy in the battle of Vezekény in 1652, his younger brother Paul inherited the palace. The additions he made took nearly ten years to complete, and gave it the facade we see today. The rich stucco decoration was made by the Italian master Andrea Bertinalli.

=== 18th century changes ===
There were few changes made during the high and late baroque periods. In the 18th century, the interior design and staircases were about all that changed. Most areas were equipped with furnaces and stucco ceilings. The only large construction work in the palace was the renewal of the two main staircases, which are presently the same.

The palace was one of the summer residences of the Esterházy family during the time of Joseph Haydn.

=== Classical building phase ===
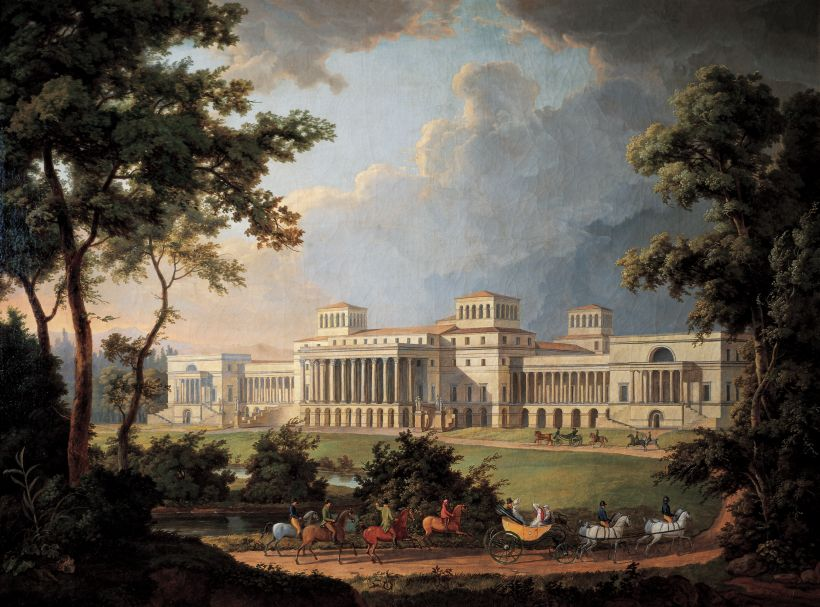
Projektierte Gartenfassade des Schlosses Esterházy by Albert Christoph Dies, 1812. Dies worked for Prince Nikolaus II during the early 19th century, and portrayed the Prince's ambitious remodeling plans on this oil painting.

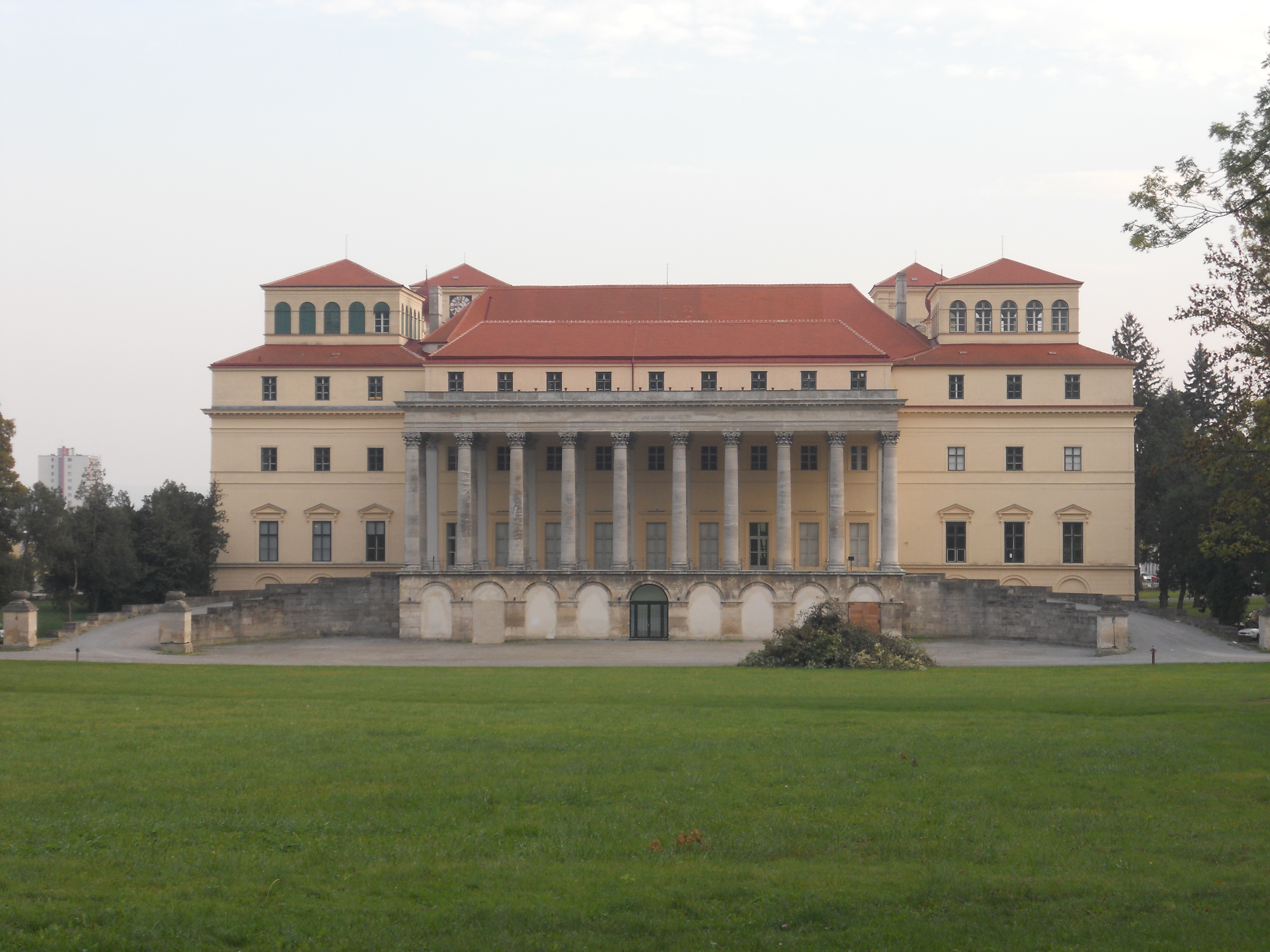
Modern view of the rear of the palace -- in the end only the central portions of the classical redesign could be completed.

Prince Anton Esterházy built considerably, despite his being in power for only a short time (1790–94). Nikolaus II, the spendthrift son of Anton, launched a program to convert the residence into Classical style. Nikolaus succeeded in acquiring the services of one of the best known French architects of the classical revolution, Charles Moreau. Moreau wanted to keep only the core of the building in baroque style, and extensively renovate and add to the palace in classical style. The eastern side would accommodate the theatre and the opera, the western the Esterházy picture gallery. Between the two north towers the garden hall would be the forerunner to today's magnificent Haydnsaal. As an entrance to this hall, Moreau built a powerful entrance with spacious ramps on each end, resting on twenty Corinthian columns. Moreau also established a set of the different "high society" rooms; many with different styles.

But Prince Nikolaus's funds, ample as they were, did not suffice to complete these renovations; his expenses (maintaining numerous mistresses, paying for the art, supporting the Austrian side in the Napoleonic wars, reviving Haydn's musical establishment), coupled with the severe inflation and economic decline that war brought to Austria, meant that the renovations could never be completed, even by subsequent generations of princes. The grand entrance Nikolaus and Moreau planned is orphaned (see image to right), as the main entrance to the palace remains to this day in its original location on the opposite end of the building, facing the town.

=== Later history ===
In the late 19th century renovation work finally began. Few changes were made in the early part of the 20th century. In 1945, at the end of the Second World War, a major change was made in the purpose of the palace: it accommodated the office of the Burgenland state government and later the national court for ten years. In 1969 the Burgenland state government took over major parts of the building through lease.

=== The palace today ===
Currently, the palace is under the ownership of the Esterházy Foundation, created by Melinda Esterházy (1920–2014). As one of the most substantial palaces in Austria, it is a major tourist attraction. Visitors may view a number of rooms as well as the furnishings and artwork, and may also tour the extensive grounds behind the palace. There is a wine museum and gift shop. Guided tours are offered, as well as concerts in the Haydnsaal.

== The Haydnsaal ==
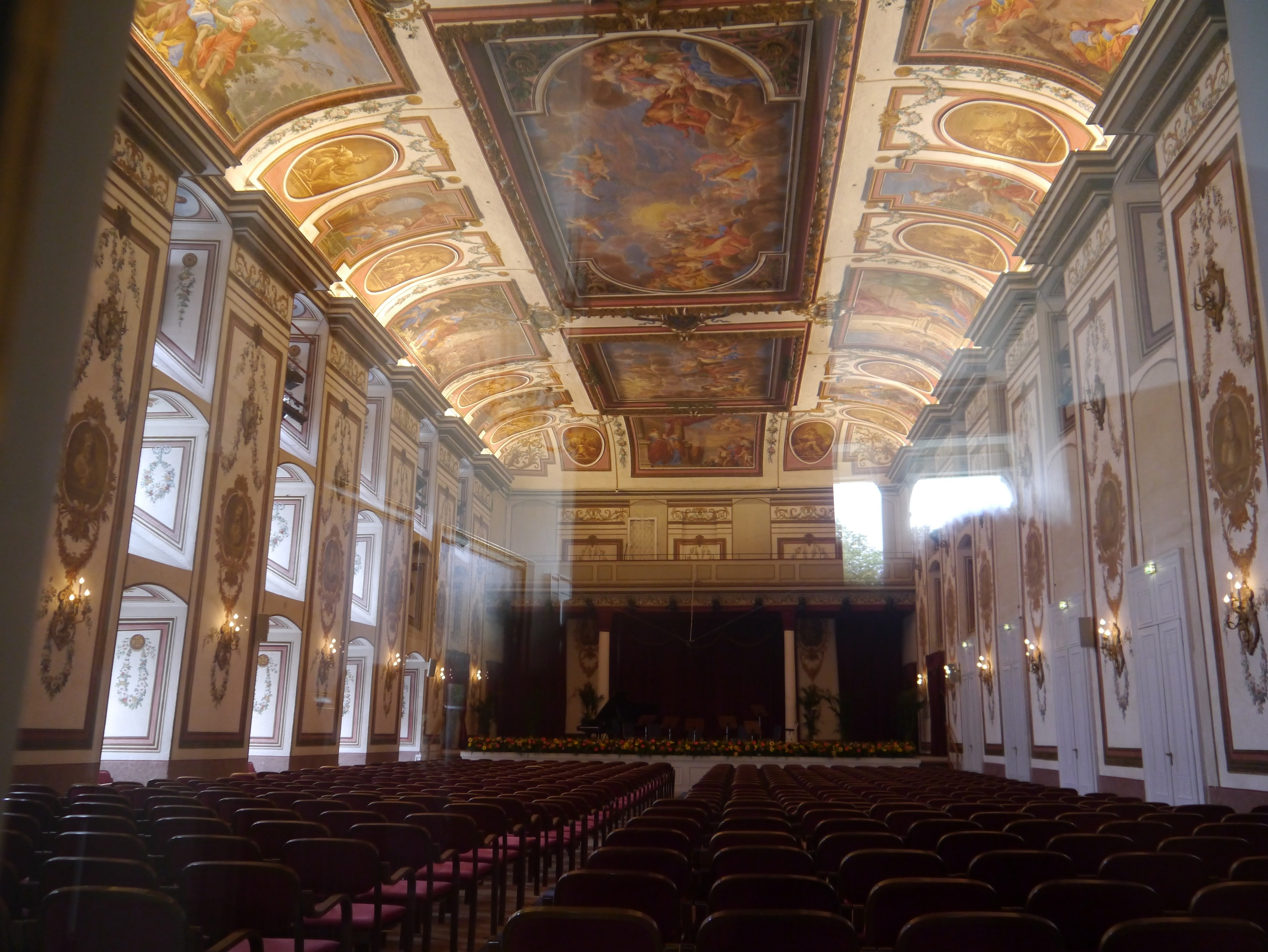
Haydnsaal

The Haydnsaal, originally the large multi-purpose festival and banquet room, is a piece of artwork in itself in the Schloss Esterházy. With its size and ornate splendor, it reflects the political, economic and cultural dominance of the Esterházy family.

Today it ranks among the most beautiful and acoustically perfect concert halls of the world. Its name goes back to the famous composer Joseph Haydn, who worked for nearly forty years in the service of the Esterházy family. Many of his works were composed and premiered in Kismarton and the Schloss Esterházy.

The Haydnsaal was established under Paul Esterházy the first, in the course of the baroque building phase (1663–72). It was part of plans made by Carlo Martino Carlone, originating from Italy, which covered the largest part of the northern wing. It extends over three stories, whereby the side facing to the courtyard three windows are poised one above the other.

At the beginning of the classical change period, 1803, the Garden Room extended along the north side in front of the Haydnsaal. The windows previously installed there were bricked up. Friedrich Rhode, the court painter, decorated the remaining recesses with Biedermeier-style festoons. Masonry wall openings were provided at both the east and west ends, sealed off by two large alcoves, and served as access ways to the planned opera/theatre wing and gallery section.

Subsequently, two galleries were erected supported on four wooden columns headed by palm capitals. Two girandoles (candle holders) adorn the east wall of the magnificent hall.

The unique frescoes of the hall originate from the 17th century and are attributed to the painter Carpoforo Tencalla. The splendid murals and ceiling paintings represent scenes from "Metamorphoses" by the Roman poet and philosopher Apuleius (200 AD). The three centre segments and six rectangular volute panels portray scenes from the satyric novel "Cupid and Psyche". The centre panels depict the marriage of Cupid and Psyche in the presence of the Olympic Gods, while scenes taken from the lives of the two are captured in the rectangular panels.

Depicted in the cruciform volute panels are scenes taken from the myth surrounding the "Golden Apples of Hesperides". Interspaced between the ceiling frescoes are the family armorial bearings of the Esterházys (earls and alliances). Worked into the volute medallions featuring grisaille techniques are allegorical female characters symbolising the "Countries of St. Stephen's Crown".

The medallions embellishing the walls (court painter Friedrich Rohde, 1793) portray busts of Hungarian monarchs ranging from Stephen I to Emperor Leopold I. The 18 sandstone busts seen on the main façade form part of the same series.

== Gallery ==
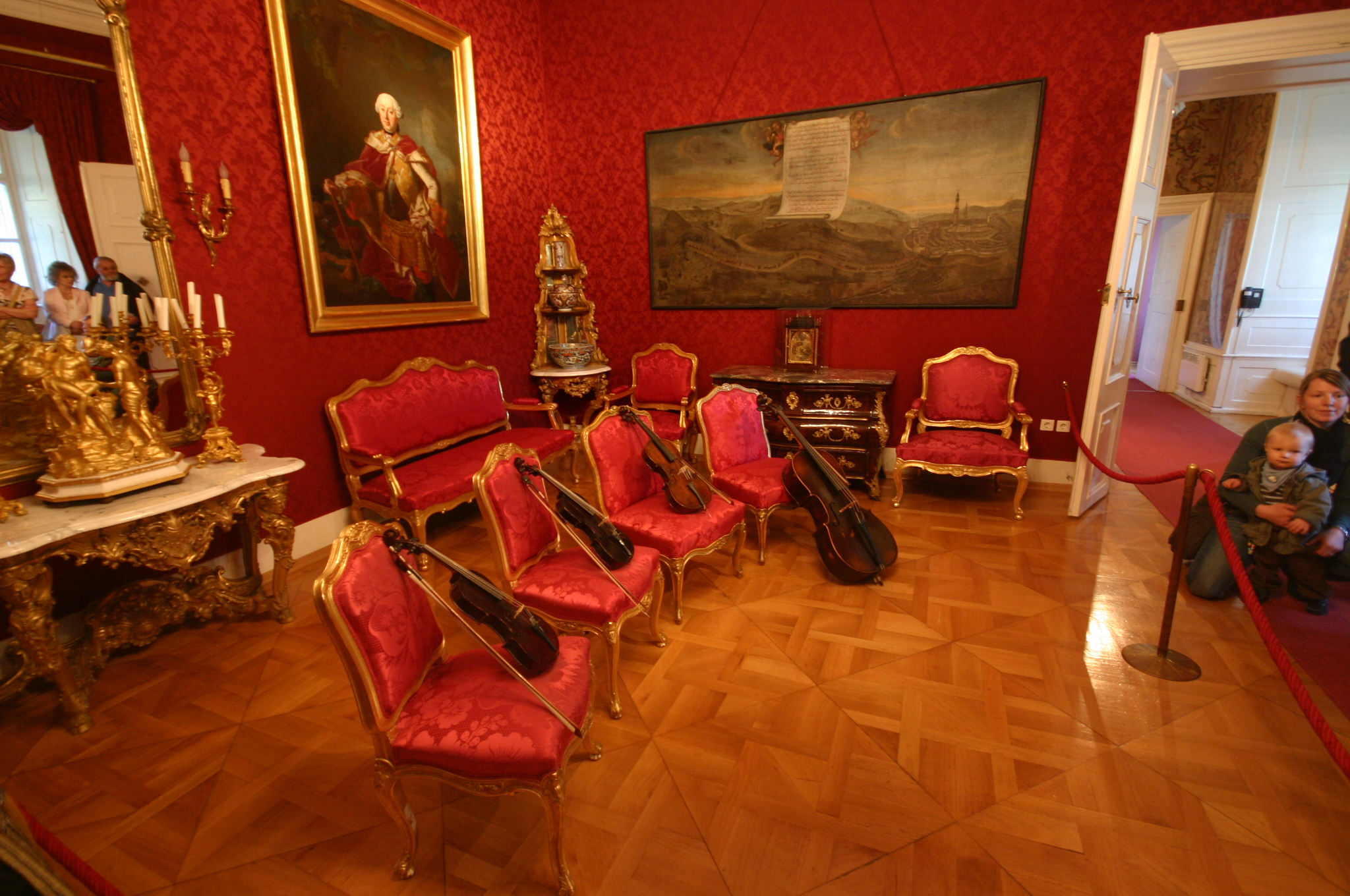
Red Salon; the portrait on the wall is of the Esterházy prince Paul Anton II

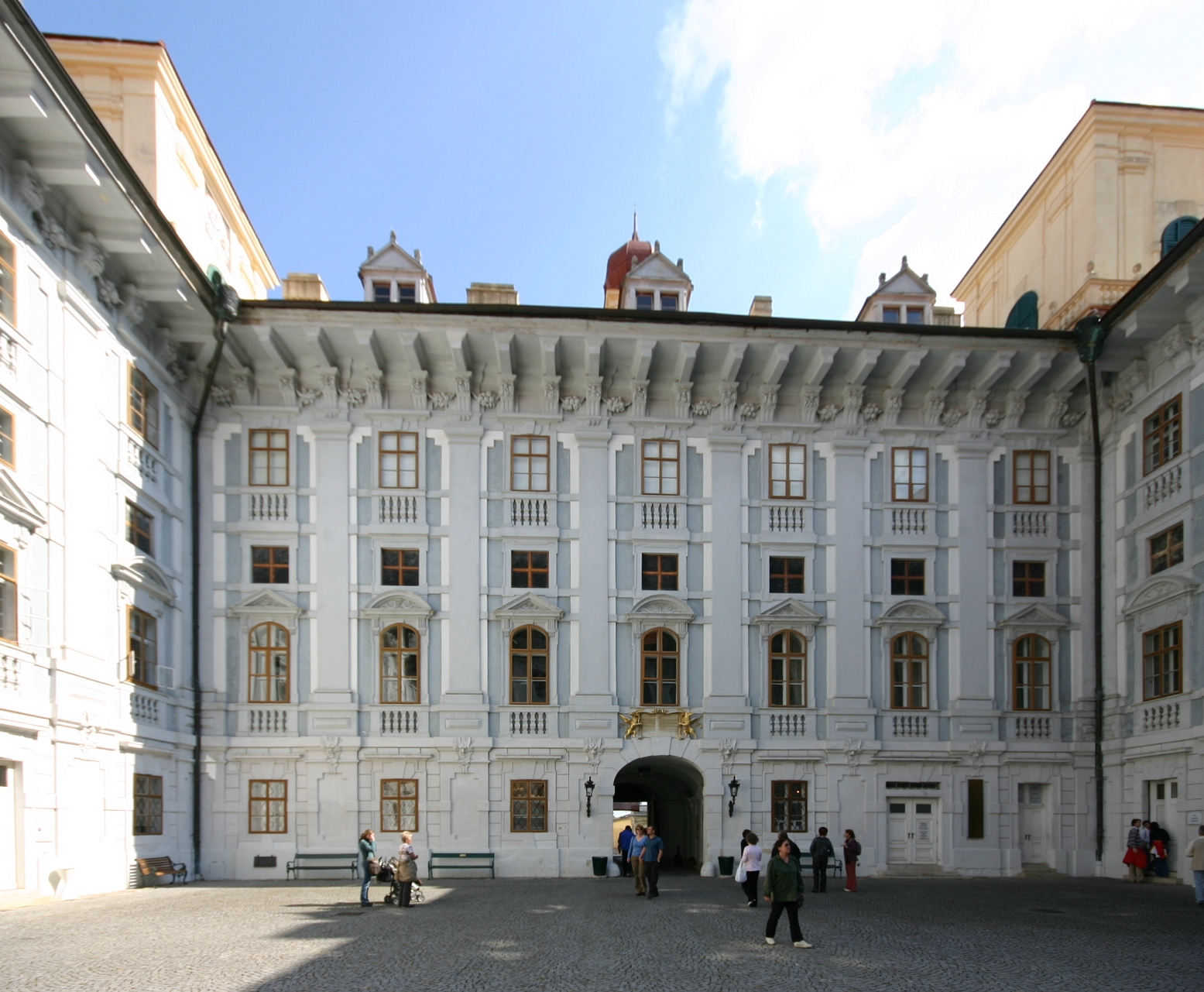
Inner courtyard of the palace

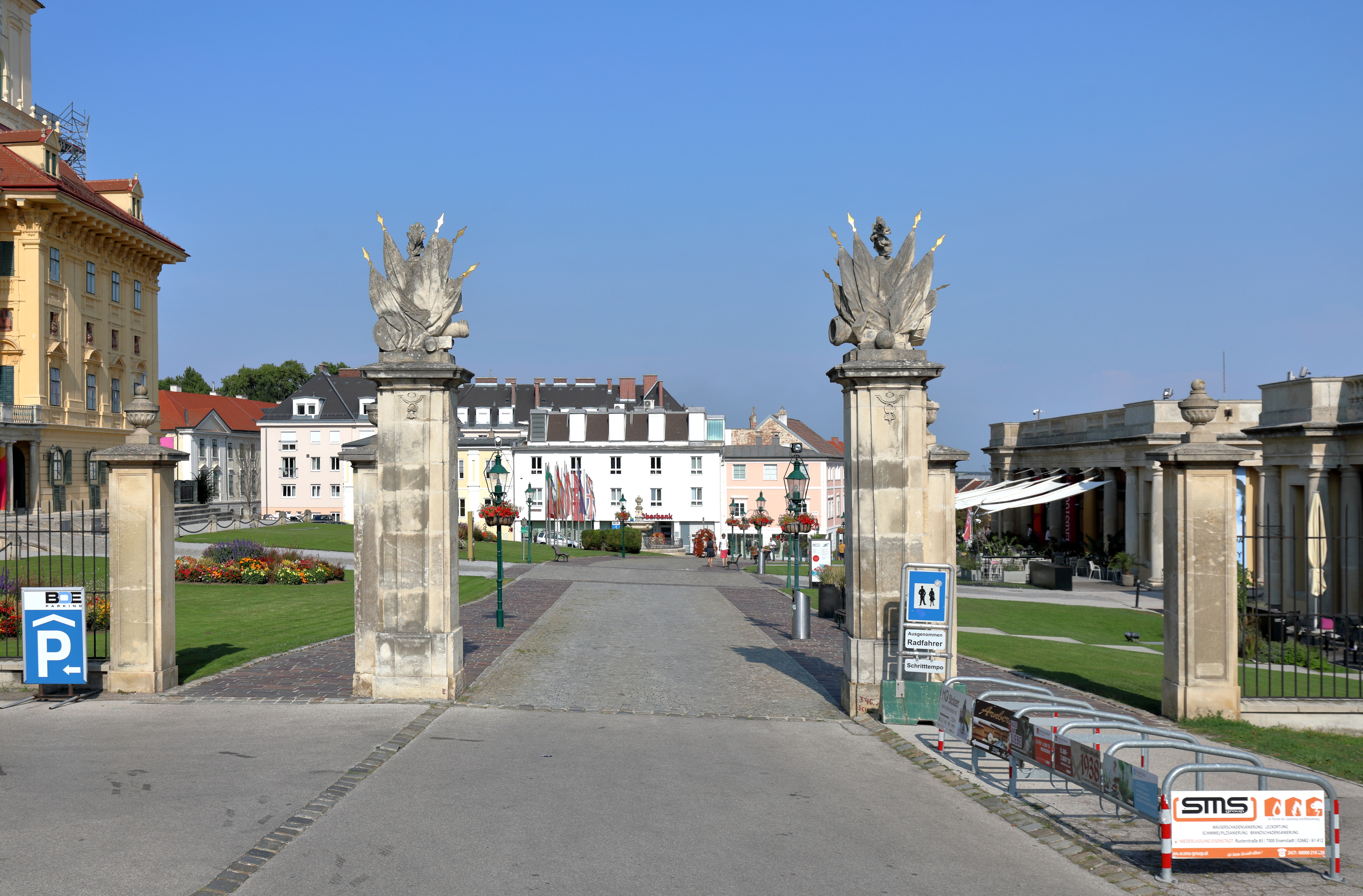
Entrance gate

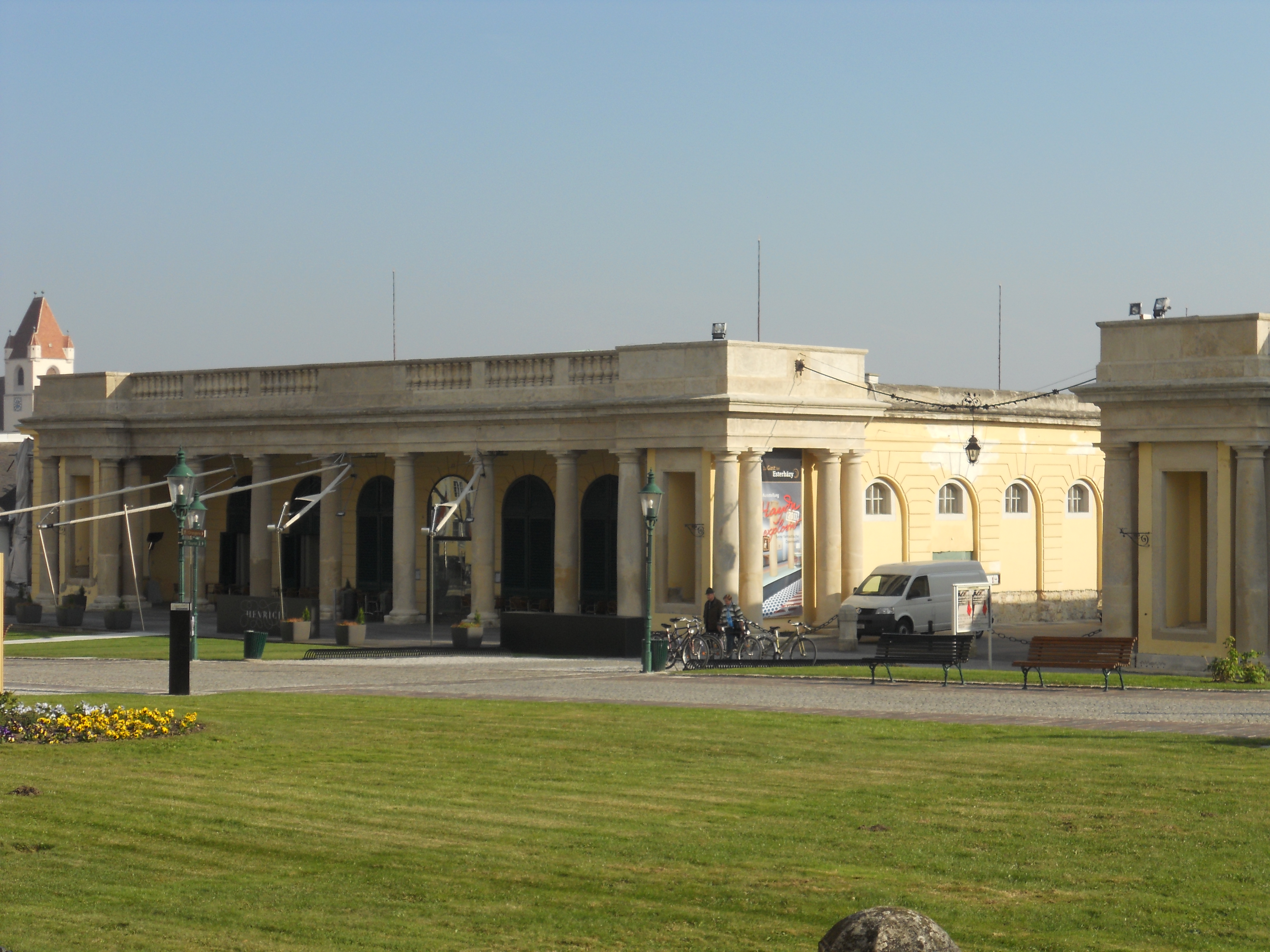
Former stables, opposite the palace on the plaza

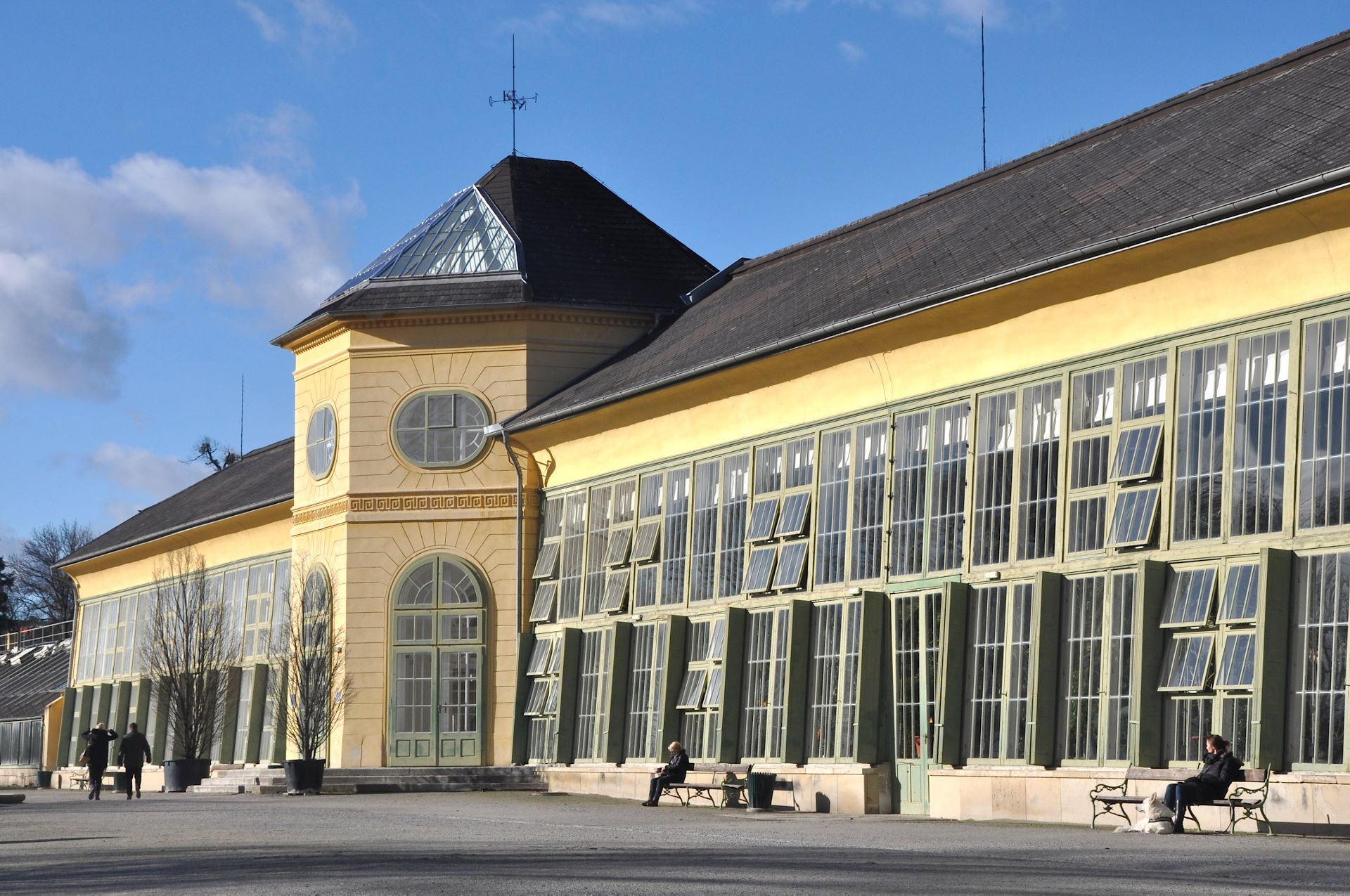
Orangerie in the palace grounds

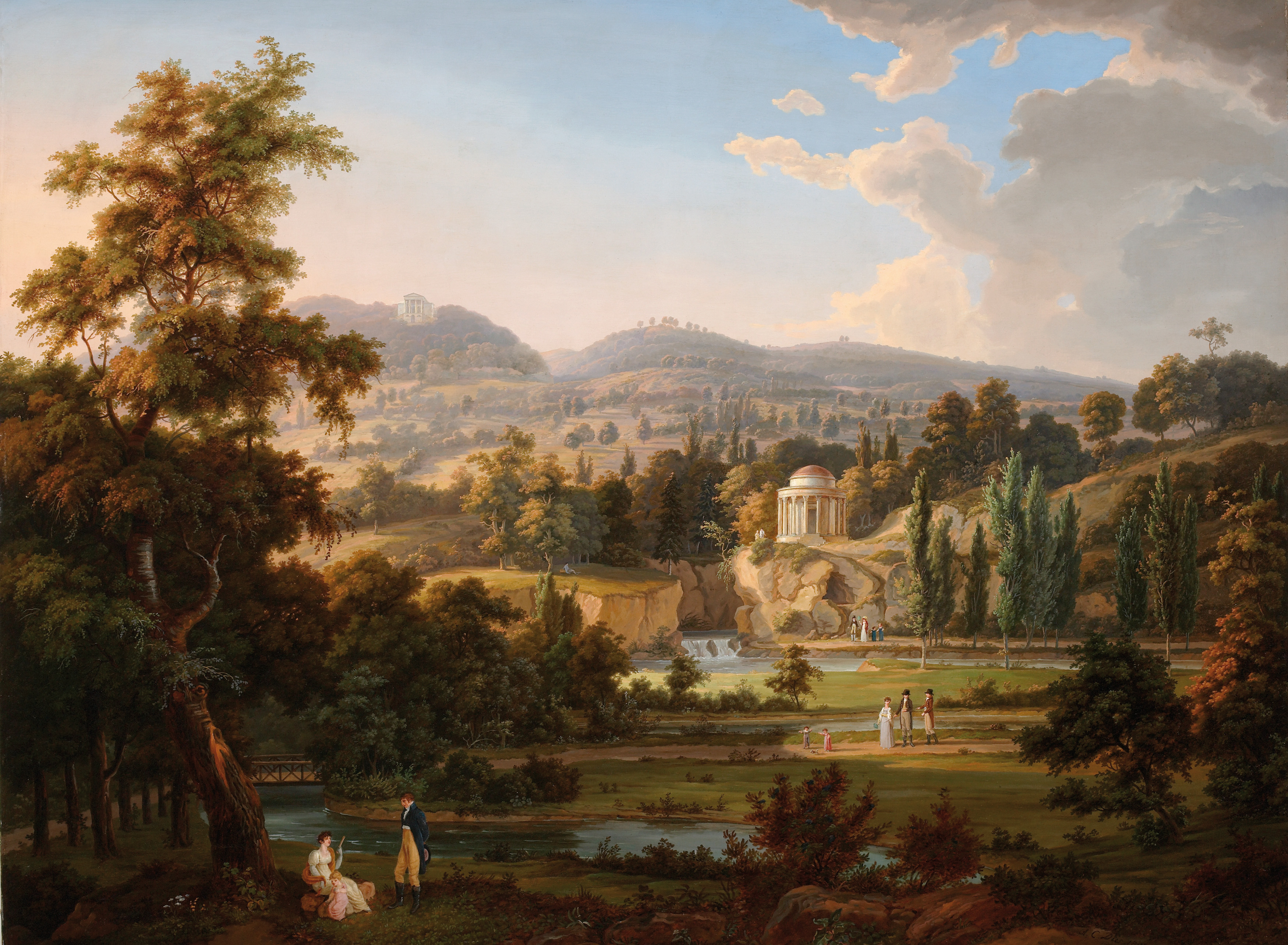
In 1807 Prince Nikolaus's artist Albert Christoph Dies painted the view from the rear entrance, including the Leopoldinentempel. The view is similar today though more heavily wooded.

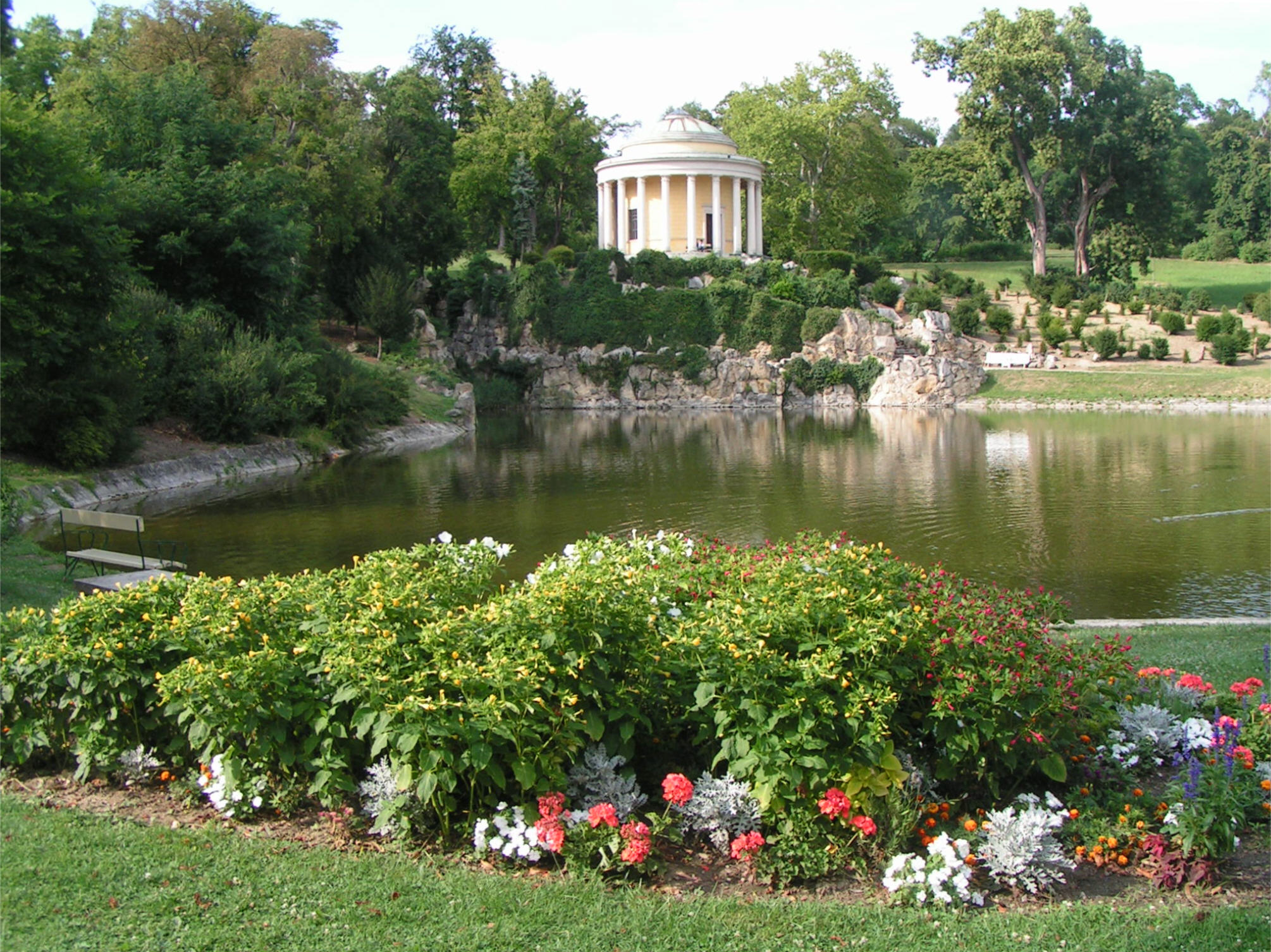
Leopoldinentempel today

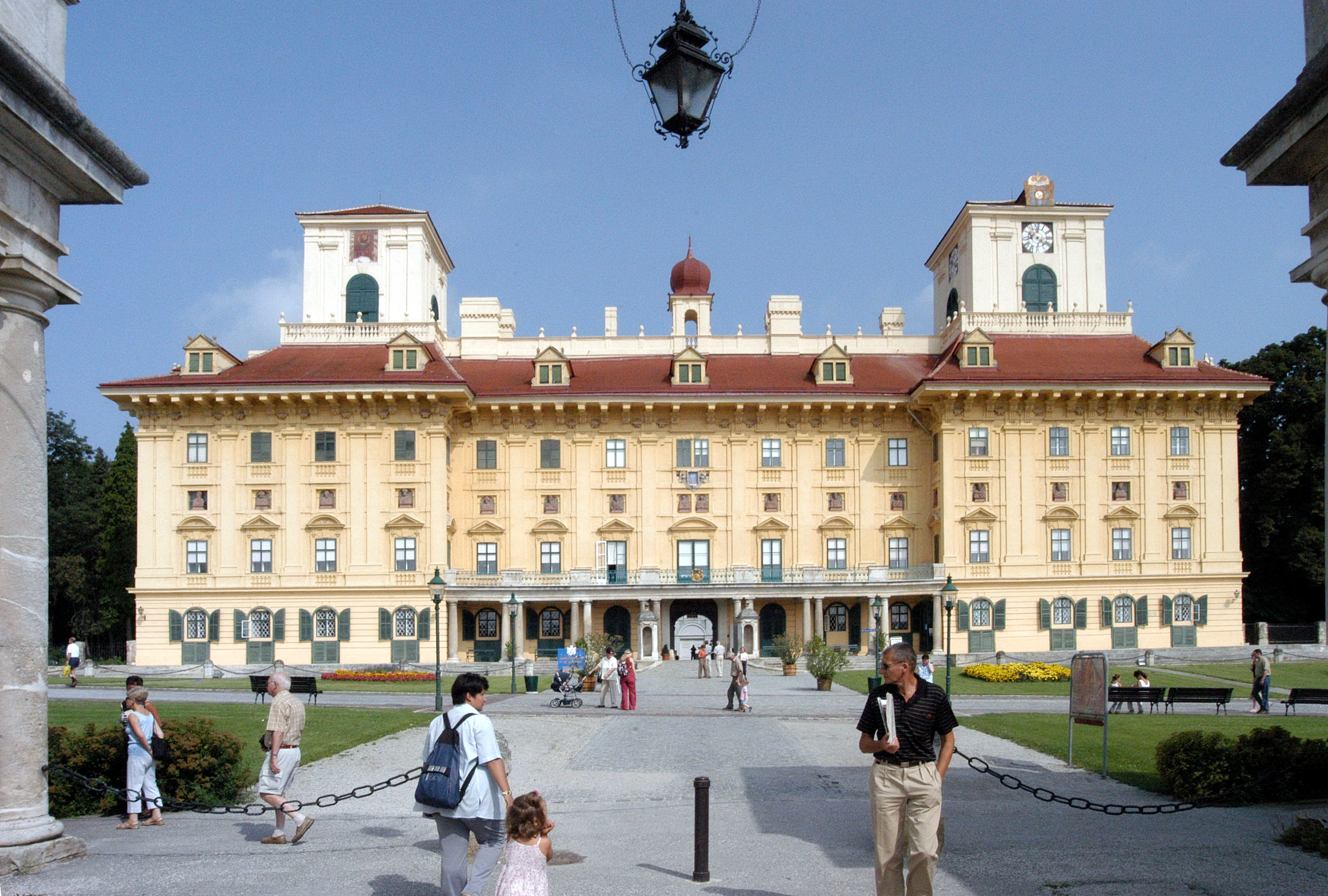
Front view of palace from plaza

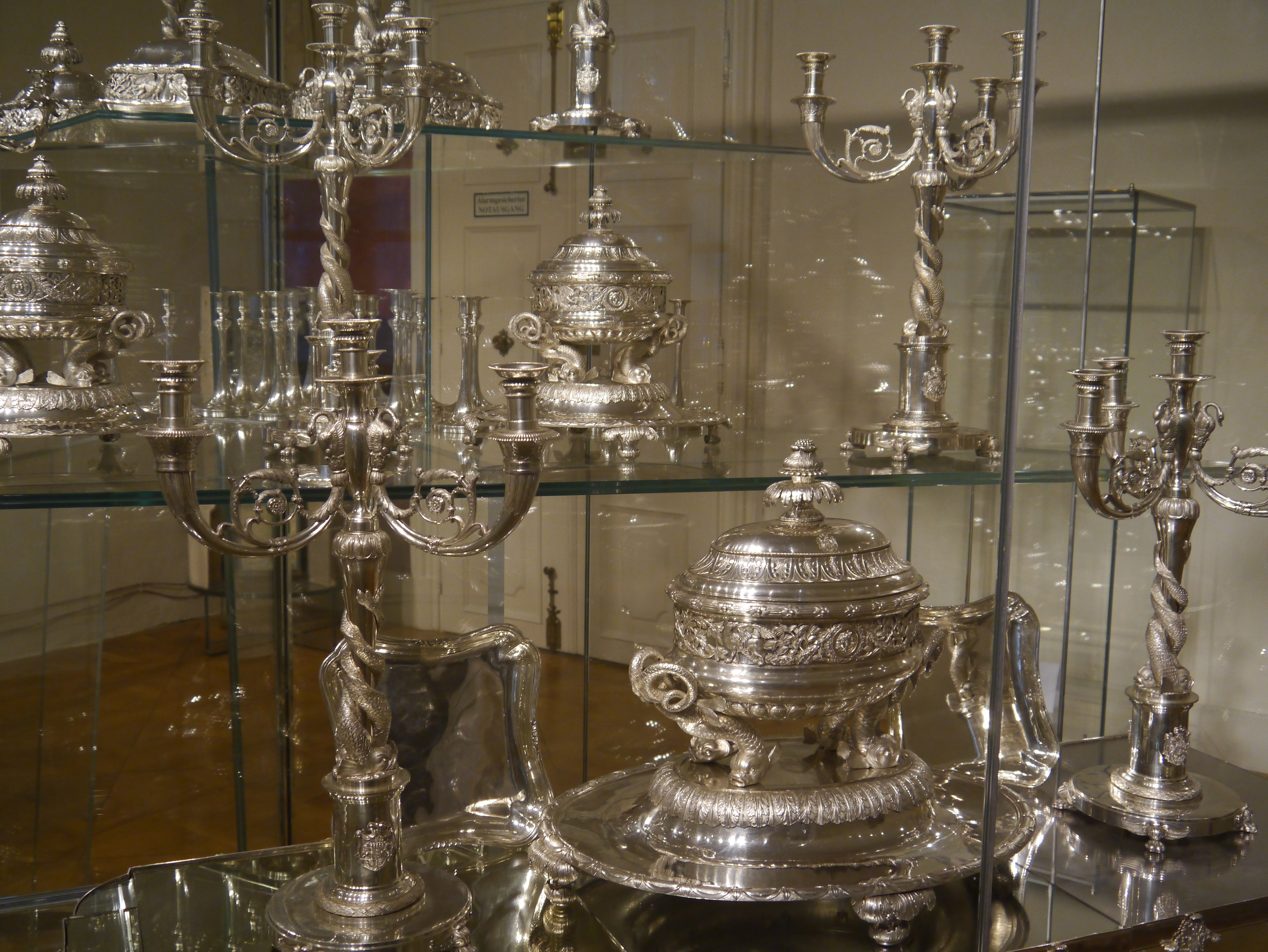
Silver dishes

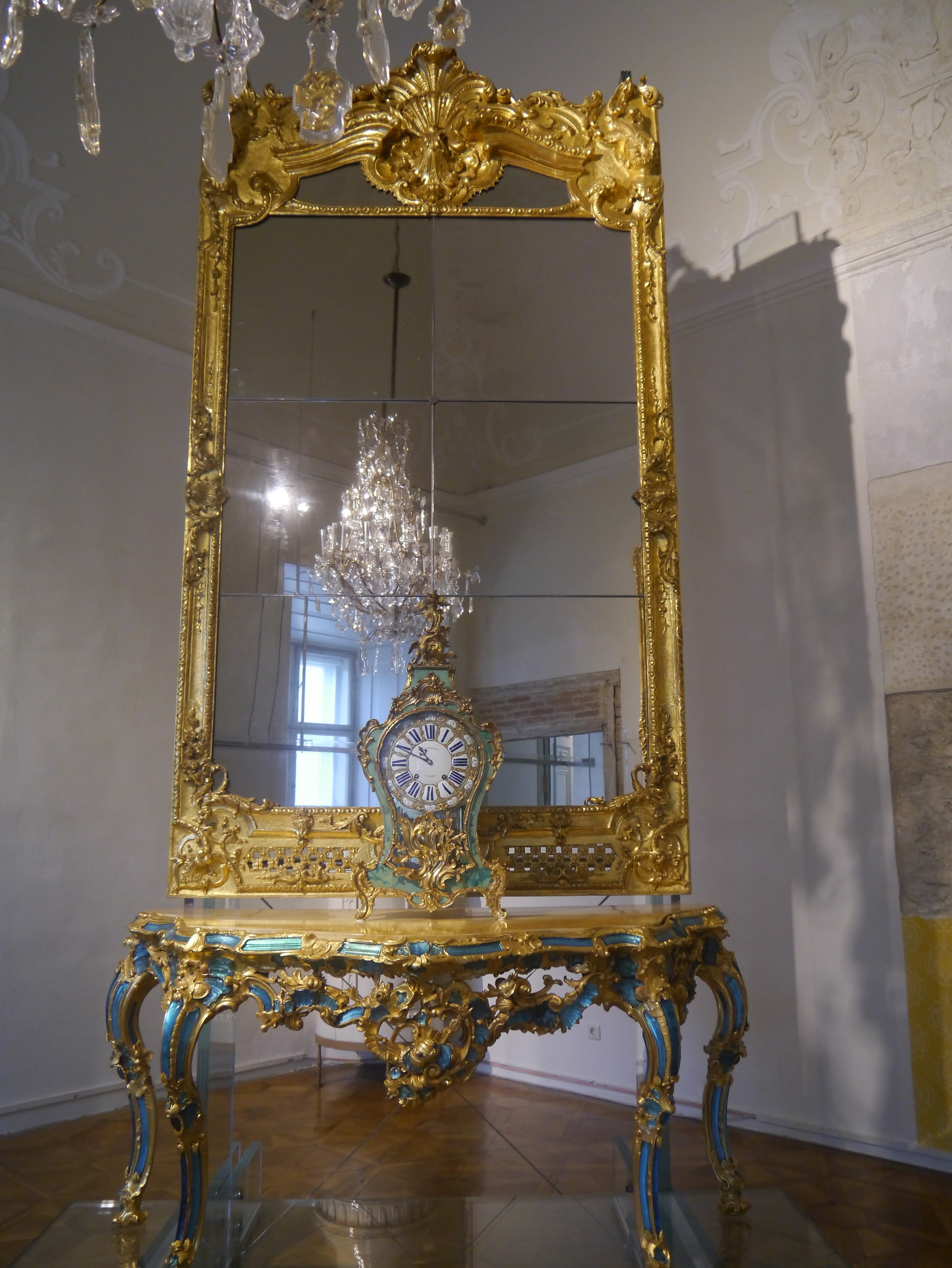
Mirror table

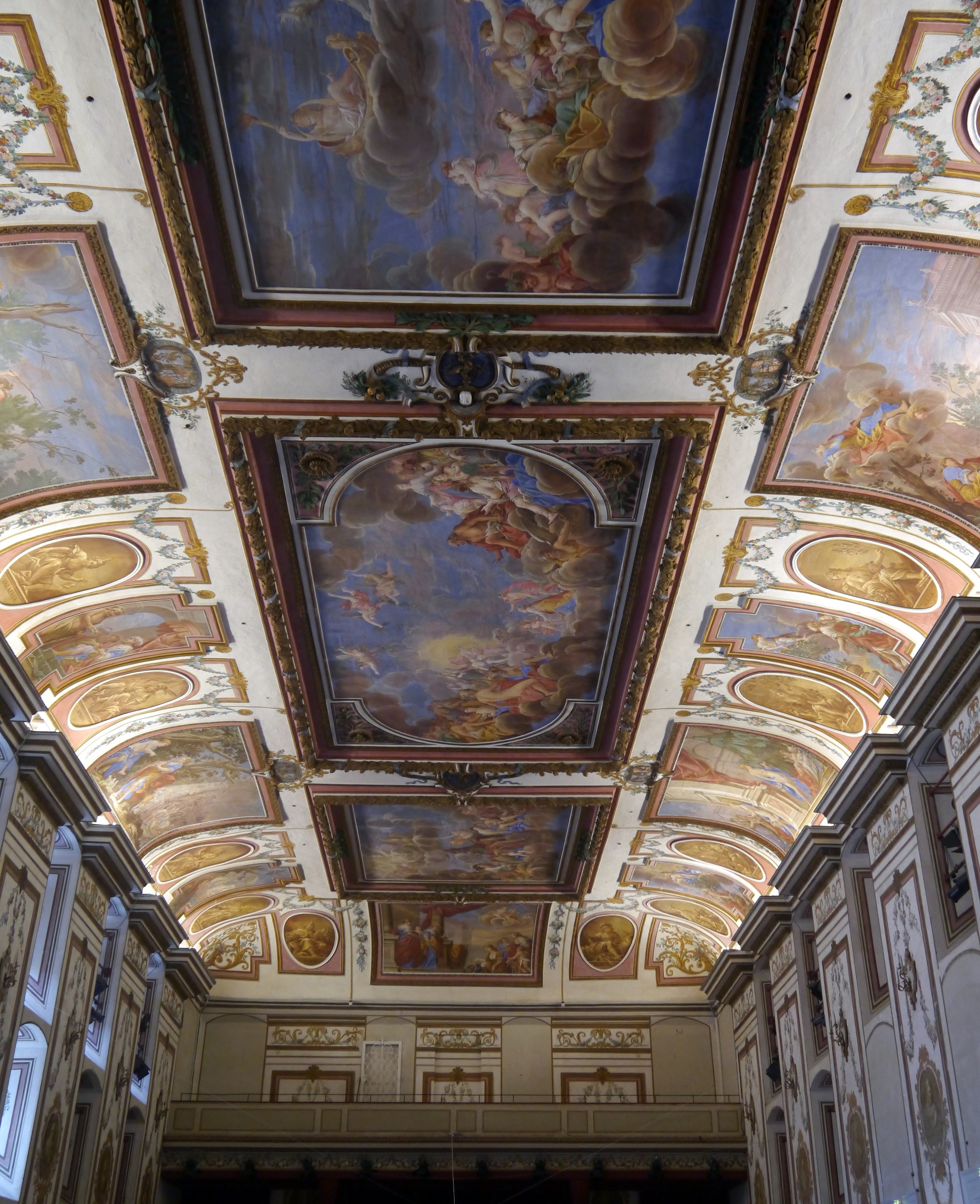
Haydnsaal ceiling

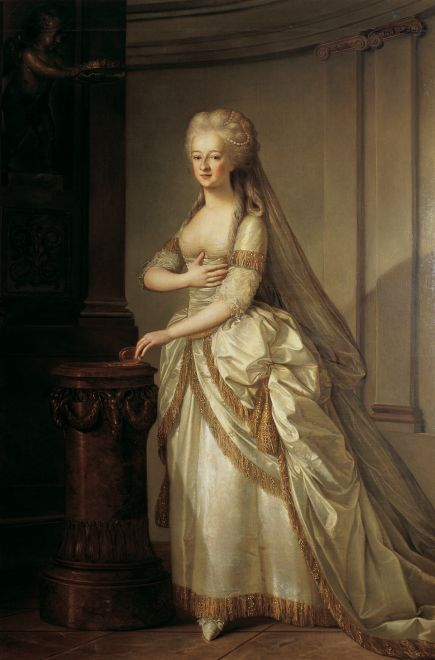
Princess Maria Josepha Hermenegildis of Liechtenstein by Johann Georg Weikert, 1784. The wife of Nikolaus II, she was a friend and supporter of Haydn, who wrote his last six masses in celebration of her name day.

== See also ==
- List of Baroque residences
