= Nikolaus II, Prince Esterházy =

Hungarian prince

Nikolaus II
- Prince Esterházy
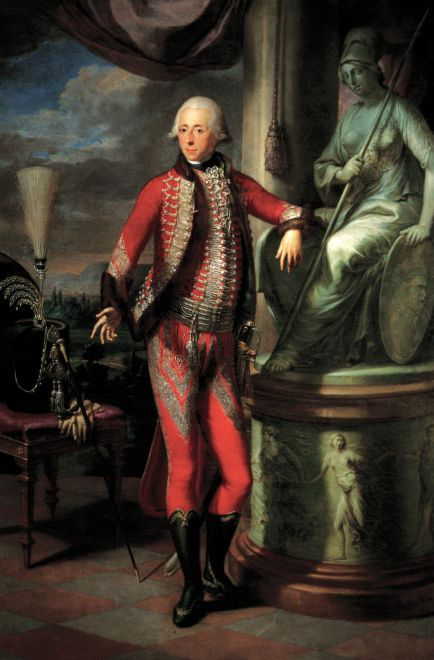
- Nikolaus II as portrayed by Martin Knoller in 1793. Oil on canvas. Esterházy Privatstiftung, Burgenland.
- Born: 12 December 1765; Vienna
- Died: 24 November 1833 (aged 67); Como
- Noble family: Esterházy
- Spouse: Princess Maria Josepha Hermengilde of Liechtenstein (m. 1783)
- Issue: Paul III Anton Esterházy; Leopoldine Esterházy; Nikolaus Esterházy
- Father: Prince Anton Esterházy
- Mother: Maria Theresia, Countess Erdödy de Monyorokerek et Monoszlo

Nicholas II, Prince Esterházy (Hungarian: Esterházy II. Miklós, German: Nikolaus II Esterházy; 12 December 1765 – 24 November 1833) was a Hungarian prince. He served the Austrian Empire and was a member of the famous Esterházy family. He is especially remembered for his art collection and for his role as the last patron of Joseph Haydn.

After the Congress of Vienna, his family was given standing as one of the mediatised houses, a new status which accompanied loss of their sovereignty for their Principality of Edelstetten (Edelstetten Abbey). Edelstetten came under the Bavarian constitutional monarchy after 1806, and limited upper chamber voting rights continued until the early decades of the German Federation.

== Life ==
Nikolaus was born in Vienna on 12 December 1765, the son of Prince Anton Esterházy and his first wife, Maria Theresia, Countess Erdödy de Monyorokerek et Monoszlo (1745–1782). His father Anton was the son of Nikolaus I, whom he succeeded as reigning prince on the latter's death in 1790. In 1783, the younger Nikolaus, aged 17, married the 15-year-old Princess Maria Josepha Hermengilde of Liechtenstein (1768–1845). According to Mraz (2009b), the marriage was not a happy one (see below, "debauchery"). It produced three children: Paul (1786–1866), who succeeded Nikolaus as prince, Leopoldine (1788–1846), and Nikolaus (1799–1844).

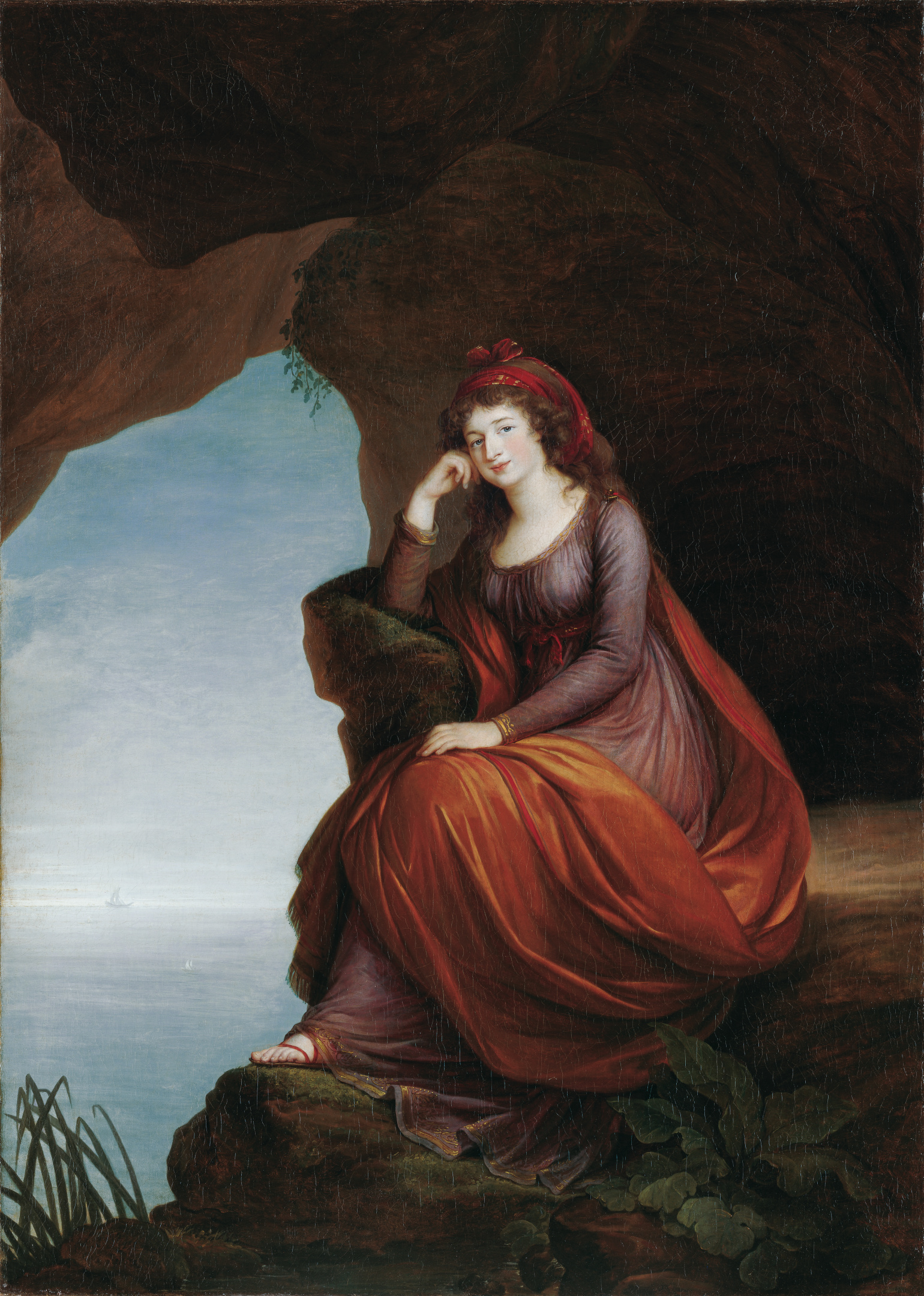
His wife, Maria Josepha Hermengilde of Liechtenstein

Nikolaus II became the reigning prince on the death of his father in 1794. Like many of the aristocrats of the Austrian Empire, he spent much of his time in Vienna, where his family had a palace. He also spent some time, particularly in summer, in his palace (the traditional family seat) in Eisenstadt. Like his father Anton, Nikolaus had little interest during his reign in living in or visiting Esterháza, the famous palace that Nikolaus I had built in rural Hungary.

== Military and diplomatic career ==
Like most of the princes in his line, Nikolaus pursued a career as a military officer. He was promoted to major general on 13 May 1796, and to Lieutenant-Field Marshal in 1803; in 1817, he was promoted to General-Feldzeugmeister. In 1802, he was appointed Colonel and Proprietor (Inhaber) of the 32nd Infantry Regiment, a position he held also until his death and, like his father, he was also a Captain of the Hungarian Noble Life Guard, from December 1803 until his death in 1833.

After achieving the rank of Feldzeugmeister Nikolaus quit the army for diplomacy and was employed as extraordinary ambassador on several important occasions. He received the Grand Cross of the Order of St. Stephen in 1797 and was initiated into the Order of the Golden Fleece on 7 January 1808. He also served as an imperial and royal Chamberlain and Privy councillor. In 1829, he received from the Grand Duchy of Baden, the Order of Fidelity in 1829 and the Grand Cross of the Order of the Zähringer Lion. The Kingdom of Bavaria awarded him the Military Order of St. Hubert and the House of Hannover awarded him the Grand Cross of the Guelphic Order in 1816.

A dramatic moment in Nikolaus's career occurred in 1809. Napoleon, having just defeated the Austrian armies and occupied Vienna, sought to weaken the Habsburg monarchy by severing its Hungarian territories. Nikolaus was Napoleon's candidate to serve as King of an independent Hungary. Faithful to the Esterházy tradition of loyalty to their Emperor, Nikolaus refused the offer, and indeed he went further and raised a regiment of volunteers to help defend the Empire, an action he had previously taken in 1797. Hungary remained part of the Empire until the 20th century.

== As patron of art and architecture ==
Nikolaus amassed a large art collection, in part during an Italian tour in 1794–1795. Among the artists represented were Andrea del Sarto, Corregio, Raphael, and Claude Lorrain. He employed a curator, Joseph Fischer, who was also a landscape painter and engraver. Nikolaus spent some years trying to find a home for his collection (and also protecting it during the Napoleonic invasions of 1805 and 1809; at one point in the latter year it was shipped down the Danube to Pest for safety). Eventually it was installed in the palace of Prince Kaunitz, which Nikolaus bought in 1814. The palace was converted to a gallery open to the public and was considered an important collection.

=== Palace and gardens ===
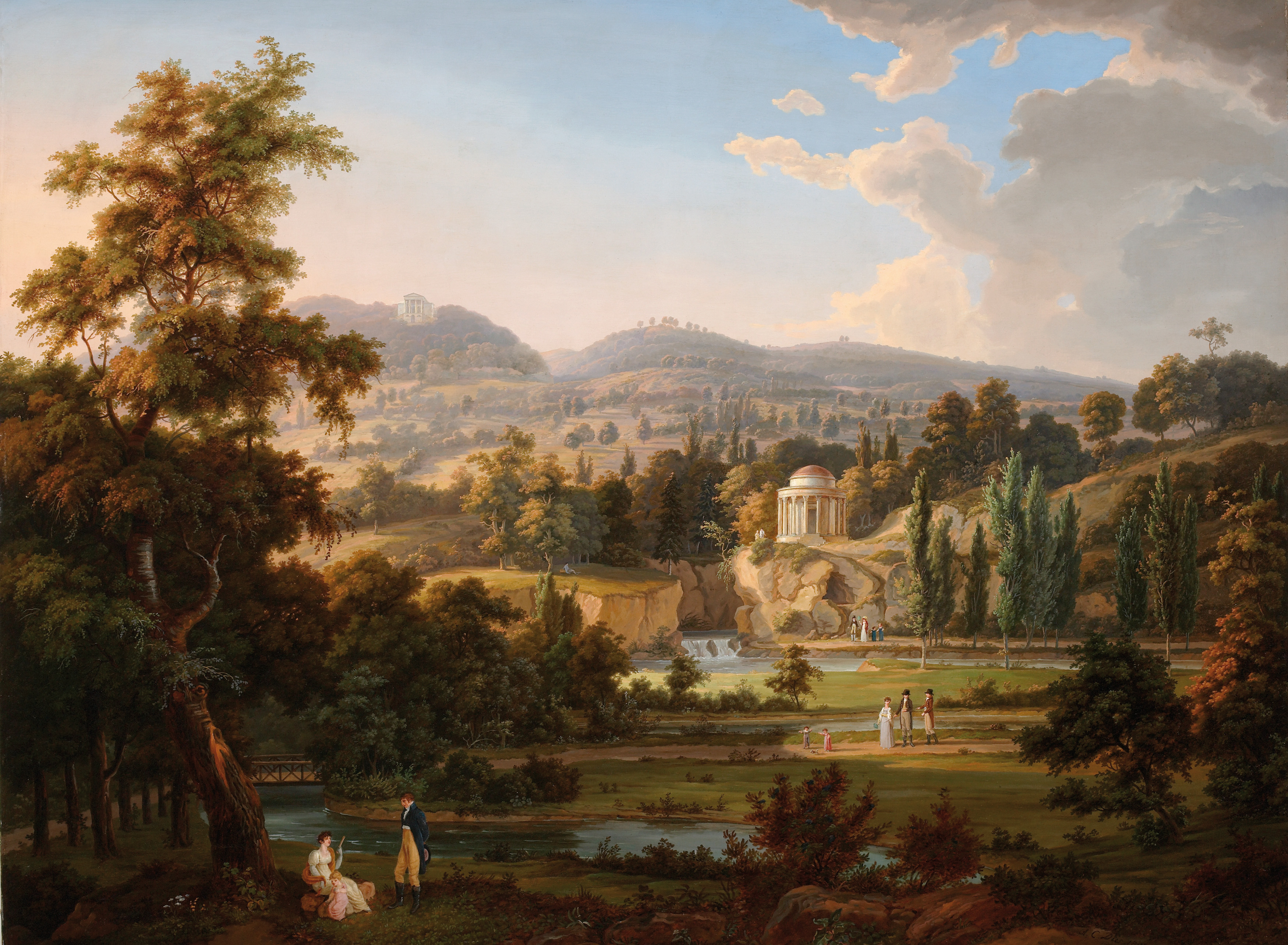
A rendering by Albert Christoph Dies of the newly redesigned gardens at the family palace in Eisenstadt. The view is similar today though more wooded.

Nikolaus remodeled the family palace at Eisenstadt, converting it from Baroque to Classical style. He also caused the gardens to be laid out in contemporary (English) style (1797).

The redesigned gardens included extensive greenhouses, intended both to support landscaping and to house a large collection of plants, which by 1820 had grown to 60,000 varieties. The greenhouses were divided into rooms controlled for temperature and humidity. Starting in 1803, they were watered by a pump operated by a steam engine imported from England—the first steam engine in the Austrian Empire.

In 1820, Esterházy was honoured by Austrian-Czech botanist, zoologist and entomologist, Johann Christian Mikan who named a plant species from South America after him, Esterhazya.

== As patron of music ==
The prince was at least at some level a musician (a portrait of him by Fischer shows him playing the clarinet) and he spent some of his wealth as a patron of music.

=== Haydn ===
When Nikolaus succeeded his father as prince, he partially revived the Esterházy musical establishment, which had flourished (with a full orchestra and opera company) under his grandfather Nikolaus I, but had been severely cut back by his father Anton. (Note: The restoration began in 1795, after Nikolaus had returned from his Italian art-collecting journey (June 1795) and Haydn had returned from his final visit to London (August). Source: Jones 2009:167, 174) Nikolaus persuaded Joseph Haydn to return as active (though part-time) Kapellmeister, and gradually built up the Chor musique, his group of instrumentalists and singers: 15 in 1796, 29 by 1802.

These musical forces, augmented by occasional extras, premiered several major works, notably the six masses composed by Haydn, some in celebration of the name day of Nikolaus's wife Maria Hermenegild. That Haydn's compositions for Nikolaus were primarily religious works (in contrast to the symphonies and operas Haydn had composed for Nikolaus's grandfather) reflects the Prince's own preference for religious music.

Nikolaus initially had a difficult relationship with Haydn. He treated the world-famous composer as a servant, addressing him with the low-status pronoun "Er" and calling him merely "Haydn" ("Herr Haydn" or indeed "Dr. Haydn" would have been more respectful, given that Haydn had received an honorary degree from Oxford University). Under the influence of his wife, Nikolaus gradually changed his attitude and eventually was more respectful to his Kapellmeister.

During Haydn's long period of infirmity (roughly 1803 to his death in 1809), the Prince was very supportive, increasing his pension to compensate for inflation (1806) and covering his medical expenses. He served Haydn posthumously in 1820 by his vigorous—though unsuccessful—efforts to recover the composer's stolen skull. He also erected a monument to the composer at the Eisenstadt palace.

=== Other musical patronage ===
Nikolaus was also active in the musical life of Vienna. He was a member of the Gesellschaft der Associierten, an organization of aristocrats that played an important role in organizing concerts, and also was one of the aristocratic subscribers to the first major published work of Ludwig van Beethoven, his Opus 1 piano trios.

Following Haydn's retirement (Note: Haydn's ability to work as a composer gradually diminished in the early 1800s; his last composition and his last public performance were in 1803 and he thereafter lived as an invalid but retained his title of Esterházy Kapellmeister.) the musical establishment financed by Nikolaus continued under other leaders, including Johann Michael Fuchs and Johann Nepomuk Hummel. Nikolaus commissioned the 1807 Mass in C of Ludwig van Beethoven, continuing the tradition of masses composed for the Princess's name day. The Prince did not like the work and the comment he made at the premiere led Beethoven to depart in a huff. Nikolaus later wrote to Countess Henriette Zielinska, "Beethoven's music is unbearably ridiculous and detestable; I am not convinced it can ever be performed properly. I am angry and ashamed."

== His debauchery ==
According to Mraz (2009a), Nikolaus was known "for his debauched lifestyle, keeping what amounted to a private brothel in the Landstraße". One commentator said that he had 200 mistresses and fathered 100 illegitimate children.

== Financial demise and death ==
According to Mraz, Nikolaus "coped poorly" with the very high inflation that arose in the Austrian Empire as the result of the Napoleonic Wars. He continued to spend freely both on art works and on his brothel, and ultimately the law intervened, subjecting him to a sequestration order (1832). Mraz describes the end of his life as "ignominious". He died in 1833 in Como, Italy.

== Persona ==
Haydn biographer Karl Geiringer describes Nikolaus II thus: "He was as complete an autocrat as his grandfather had been, but lacked the latter's charm, kindliness, and genuine understanding of music . . . contemporaries described the prince's nature as 'worthy of an Asiatic despot'".

== Bibliography ==
- Geiringer, Karl (1946) Haydn: A Creative Life in Music. New York: Norton, New York.
- Jones, David Wyn (1998) The Life of Beethoven. Cambridge: Cambridge University Press.
- Jones, David Wyn (2009) The Life of Haydn. Oxford: Oxford University Press.
- Mraz, Gerda (2009a) Esterházy, Prince Nicolaus II. In Jones, David Wyn, Oxford Composer Companions: Haydn. Oxford: Oxford University Press.
- Mraz, Gerda (2009b) Esterházy, Princess Marie Hemenegild. In Jones, David Wyn, Oxford Composer Companions: Haydn. Oxford: Oxford University Press.
- Siegel, Brigitt (2006) Der Garten - ein Ort des Wandels (In German) ("The garden: a place of change"). vdf Hochschulverlag AG.
- Thomas Günter (2010) "Esterházy". Article in the New Grove Dictionary of Music and Musicians, online edition. Oxford University Press.
