= Anton I, Prince Esterházy =

Anton I
- 6th Prince Esterházy of Galántha
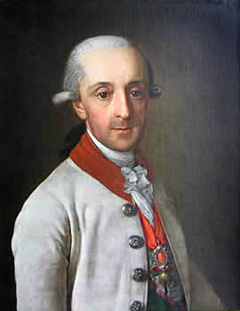
- The Prince in the uniform of his Hungarian Infantry Regiment, wearing the insignia of the Order of the Golden Fleece (portrait by Johann Basilius Grundmann, c. 1791)

Prince Esterházy of Galántha
- Reign: September 28, 1790 – January 22, 1794
- Predecessor: Nikolaus I
- Successor: Nikolaus II
- Born: Graf Anton Joseph Esterházy von Galántha; 11 April 1738; Vienna, Austria, Holy Roman Empire
- Died: January 22, 1794 (aged 55); Vienna, Austria, Holy Roman Empire
- Buried: Franziskanerkirche, Kismarton (Eisenstadt)
- Noble family: Esterházy
- Spouses: Maria Theresia Erdődy (m. 1763; died 1782); Maria Anna von Hohenfeld (m. 1785)
- Issue: Nikolaus II, Prince Esterházy; Anton Esterházy de Galántha; Therese Esterházy de Galántha; Leopoldine Esterházy de Galántha
- Father: Nikolaus I, Prince Esterházy
- Mother: Marie Elisabeth Ungnad von Weißenwolff
- Military career
- Allegiance: Habsburg Monarchy
- Branch: Imperial Army
- Rank: Feldzeugmeister
- Unit: Infantry Regiment No. 34
- Commands: Hungarian Noble Guard (Captain)
- Conflicts: Seven Years' War; Battle of Torgau (POW); War of the Bavarian Succession; Austro-Turkish War (1788–1791); Siege of Belgrade (1789); War of the First Coalition
- Awards: Order of the Golden Fleece; Military Order of Maria Theresa; Order of Saint Stephen of Hungary

Anton (Antal), Prince Esterházy de Galántha (11 April 1738 – 22 January 1794) was a hungarian prince, a member of the wealthy Esterházy family. He is primarily known for his patronage on composer Joseph Haydn.

== Life ==
At the time of Anton's birth his father Nikolaus Esterházy bore the title Graf (Count) Esterházy de Galántha. Nikolaus was a successful general and lieutenant field marshal in Austrian service who would later achieve distinction at the Battle of Kolín (1757) in the Seven Years' War leading his cavalry in a battle-winning charge. When Nikolaus's brother died without heirs, Nikolaus acquired the family patrimony, becoming the fifth prince in the Esterházy line.

As such, he inherited considerable wealth, with which he built the magnificent palace of Esterháza in Hungary and patronized the arts. In particular he paid an entire orchestra, later a full-scale opera company, both directed by the composer Joseph Haydn. Anton's mother, Marie Elisabeth, was the daughter of Ferdinand Ungnadin, Reichsgraf (Imperial Count) von Weissenwolf.

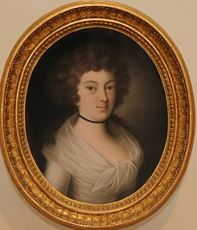
Prince Paul's wife, Maria Theresia, Countess Erdödy de Monyorokerek et Monoszlo.

On 13 January 1763 Anton married Maria Theresia, Gräfin (Countess) Erdödy de Monyorokerek et Monoszlo (1745–1782) in Vienna. They had four children: Nikolaus (who succeeded him as prince), Anton (who died of wounds from the Austro-Turkish War (1787-1791)), Therese, and Leopoldine. Maria Theresa died in 1782. Anton married his second wife 9 July 1785 in Vienna: she was Maria Anna, Gräfin von Hohenfeld (1768–1848).

Anton was elevated to the status of prince (German: Fürst ) in 1783, and became the reigning prince on the death of his father in 1790. He reigned as prince for only four years, dying unexpectedly of a sudden illness in 1794.

== Military career ==
During the Seven Years' War, Anton served in his father's regiment and was at one point taken prisoner by the enemy. He was promoted to Captain in 1763 and in 1780 to Fieldmarshal Lieutenant, eventually becoming head of the regiment.

He was Captain of the Hungarian Noble Life Guard from September 1791 until his death in 1794, and commanded an autonomous corps on the Upper Rhine at the beginning of the War of the First Coalition. His Corps participated in various actions between July and October 1792, after which he received the Commanders Cross of the Order of St. Stephen in 1792; he had already received the Grand Cross of the Order in 1777. His corps was later absorbed into other military formations.

He was Colonel and Proprietor (Inhaber) of the 31st Infantry Regiment, from November 1777 to October 1780, and then Colonel and Proprietor of the 34th Infantry Regiment from September 1780 until his death. He was initiated to the Order of the Golden Fleece in 1790, and became an imperial and royal Chamberlain.

== Anton and Joseph Haydn ==
Anton is perhaps best remembered to history as the third in the succession of four Esterházy princes who employed the composer Joseph Haydn as the director of their court music. By a wide margin, he was the least enthusiastic of the four in this respect.

Anton had known Haydn long before becoming the reigning prince. Thus, for Anton's marriage in 1763 the Esterházy musical ensemble performed Haydn's opera Acide as part of a lavish three-day celebration.

Before Anton became reigning prince in 1790, his father had spent a great deal on music, particular the opera company. Anton was not particularly interested in music and wanted to cut back on expenditures. Thus when he became prince he dismissed most of the Esterházy musical establishment. He retained a small Harmonie (wind band), a few musicians for church music, and also allocated small salaries (400 florins) to retain the services of Haydn and of the first violinist Luigi Tomasini; neither was expected to work on a regular basis. The laid-off musicians, some of whom had worked for the Esterházys for years, were given six weeks' severance pay. Anton was not alone in cutting back his musical establishment; this was a period of general decline in the musical forces sponsored by the empire's aristocracy.

Jones offers an account of one motivation for Anton's cutbacks: prior to his accession, Anton himself had been a spendthrift, and his father Nikolaus was worried about the long-term solvency of the family. When Anton inherited, the family's financial affairs were placed in the hands of a curator, who was to control the funds until it could be established that the finances were stable. Thus Anton had strong incentives to cut back, and moreover (Jones suggests) "a desire to demonstrate where a good deal of Esterházy expenditure had always been incurred."

Anton's cutbacks had an inadvertent though important influence on the history of music: Haydn took advantage of his new freedom to visit London, where he premiered many new works (such as the London Symphonies) in highly successful public concerts, thus helping to establish the role of composer as a public figure, independent of aristocratic patronage.

Personal relations between Anton and Haydn appear to have been friendly. The prince lent Haydn 450 gulden to cover his travel expenses on the first London journey. When in 1791 Anton wrote Haydn asking him to return to compose and direct an opera celebrating Anton's installation as Lord Lieutenant of Oedenberg, Haydn refused, as he had entered into contractual obligations. The composer feared for his job, but Anton did not fire him.
