= Baryton =

Bowed string instrument

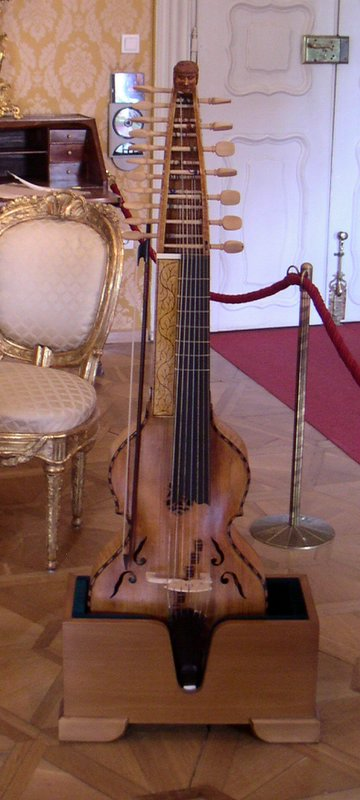
A copy of Prince Esterhazy's baryton, on display at his palace in Eisenstadt.

The baryton is a bowed string instrument similar to the viol, but distinguished by an extra set of sympathetic but also pluckable strings. It was in regular use in Europe until the end of the 18th century.

== Design ==
The baryton can be viewed as a sort of augmented bass viol. It is similar in size to the latter instrument and likewise has six or seven strings of gut (typically D G C E A D, although scordatura was used), arranged over a fretted fingerboard and played with a bow. The instrument is held vertically and is supported by the player's legs (rather than with an end-pin as in the modern cello).

The baryton differs from the bass viol in having an additional set of wire strings. These perform two functions: they vibrate sympathetically with the bowed strings, enriching the tone, and they can also be plucked by the left thumb of the performer, creating a contrasting tonal quality. As can be seen in the illustration, the bowed strings are placed on the left, where they can be easily fingered by the player's left hand. The plucked strings are on the right; they are reachable by the player's thumb from the rear, where the back of the instrument's neck is left open.

Historical barytons were not built to a single standardized string configuration. Surviving instruments and historical descriptions show considerable variation in both the number of bowed strings and the additional metal strings, with the latter differing especially widely between instruments. This variation also affected tuning and construction, meaning that the string arrangement of one surviving baryton should not necessarily be treated as representative of the instrument as a whole.

== History ==
=== The historical baryton ===
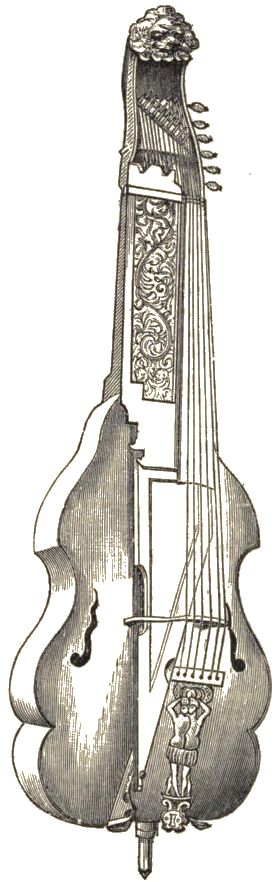
A six-stringed baryton

There are only about 50 historical barytons for which we have evidence, either in the form of documents or the instrument itself. Many of the latter have been modified from their original form. Thus, tracing the history of the baryton is a difficult task.

Concerning the origin of the baryton, Pamplin suggests that "the instrument probably originated in England in the early 17th century when the characteristics of two instruments, the viola da gamba and the bandora, were combined into one hybrid instrument". Early evidence for the existence of the baryton is found in Marin Mersenne's work Cogitata Physico-Mathematica (1644). According for Fruchtman, "Mersenne stated that the English constructed a viol or lyre much admired by King James. The instrument had six bowed strings as well as metal strings behind the neck. The thumb of the left hand plucked the metal strings, which were made to sound with the bowed notes. If this information is accurate, the baryton must have been known in England before 1625, the end of King James' reign." The earliest baryton that survives today dates from 1647; it was made by Magnus Feldlen in Vienna and is currently in the musical instrument collection of the Royal College of Music in London.

In London a performance at Marylebone Gardens was announced in 1744, Mr Ferrand was to perform on "the Pariton, an instrument never played on in public before".

The instrument was never particularly popular, but "it acquired a certain cachet in courtly circles, particularly in south Germany and Austria" (Pamplin). The compositions for the instrument by Haydn and his students and colleagues represented a last hurrah for the baryton; by the early 19th century it had gone out of style and ceased to attract new compositions. The Haydn-era baryton was different from earlier versions in a crucial respect: the sympathetic strings were tuned a full octave higher than previously. This helped the baryton to stand out from the other instruments (viola, cello) in the baryton trio, the primary form in which Haydn wrote. Since the Haydn oeuvre tends to dominate the field today, the Haydn-type tuning has become the standard. Czech composer Václav Pichl also wrote for the baryton.

=== Modern revival ===
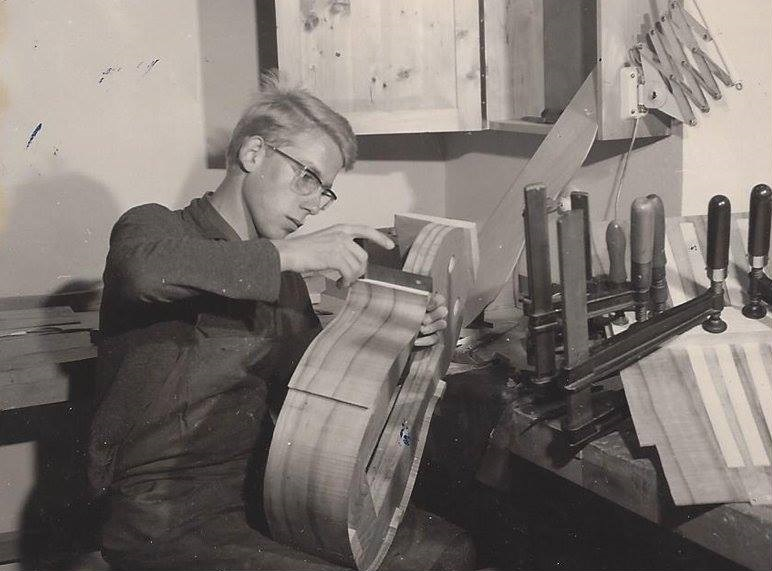
Violinmaker Hans Benning of Benning Violins creating a Baryton in Los Angeles, 1963.

The baryton was "completely neglected" (Hsu) in the nineteenth century, but in the twentieth, with the rise of the authentic performance movement in classical music, new barytons were built and played. Initially, these instruments were heavily constructed, more in the manner of a cello than a bass viol (they were thus sometimes called "cellitons"), but (much as with the parallel history of the harpsichord revival) eventually lighter instruments were constructed that more closely followed their historical antecedents.

Probably the first person to initiate the revival of the baryton was Christian Döbereiner in Munich. In 1934 he ordered a copy of an instrument by Simon Schödler (1782) from the renowned luthier, Ferdinand Wilhelm Jaura in Munich. The first performance in modern times on that baryton took place in Munich in 1936, which featured a trio by Haydn. This instrument forms part of the Vazquez Collection of Historical String Instruments and is frequently employed in performance by the Orpheon Foundation. A complete documentation of the Jaura Baryton is available at the Orpheon Foundation web site.

Among the modern active baryton players are Jeremy Brooker, Kazimierz Gruszczyński, Balázs Kakuk (Haydn Baryton Trio of Budapest), José Manuel Hernández, John Hsu, Roland Hutchinson, José Vázquez, Kenneth Slowik and Matthew Baker (Valencia Baryton Project).

With the revival of the baryton, a body of recorded work has gradually emerged. Several ensembles have produced recordings of individual works, and the Esterházy Ensemble (Michael Brüssing, baryton) has issued a set of recordings that cover the entire Haydn oeuvre.

The Swiss composer Klaus Huber has written an important solo part for the instrument in his work ... à l'âme de marcher sur ses pieds de soie ... (2004).

== Repertoire ==
Of the repertoire for this instrument, the best known works are the 175 compositions written by Joseph Haydn for his patron, Prince Nikolaus Esterházy, who enjoyed playing this instrument. Of these, 126 are trios for viola, cello and baryton. They were written in the earlier part of Haydn's career, from 1762 to 1775. Andreas Lidel was also notable for his compositions that included baryton.

== Nomenclature ==
According to the Oxford English Dictionary, the name of the instrument is a loan word from French baryton or Italian baritono, and ultimately derives from Greek bary- + tonos 'deep-pitched'. Alternate spellings include: bariton, barydon, paradon, paridon, pariton, viola paradon, viola di bordoni, [Italian] viola di bardone, [German] viola di bordone. The name lyra bastard is also sometimes used, though technically speaking it is incorrect.
