= Paul II Anton, Prince Esterházy =

Paul II Anton
- Prince Esterházy of Galántha
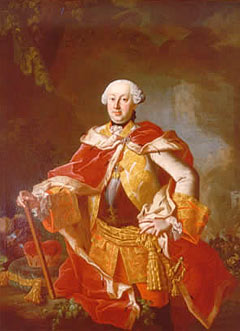

4th Prince Esterházy of Galántha
- Period: 6 June 1721 – 18 March 1762
- Predecessor: Joseph
- Successor: Nikolaus I
- Born: 22 April 1711; Kismarton (Eisenstadt), Kingdom of Hungary
- Died: 18 March 1762 (aged 50); Vienna
- Spouse: Donna Mária Anna Louisa dei Marchesi Lunatti-Visconti
Names
- Prince Paul II Anton Esterházy de Galántha; German: Paul II Anton; Hungarian: II. Pál Antal
- House: Esterházy
- Father: Joseph, Prince Esterházy
- Mother: Baroness Mária Octavia Gilleis of Theras and Sonnenberg
- Religion: Roman Catholic

Prince Paul II Anton Esterházy de Galántha (Hungarian: galánthai Esterházy II. Anton Pál herceg; 22 April 1711 – 18 March 1762) was a Hungarian prince, soldier and patron of music from the Esterházy family.

== Life ==
=== Early life ===
Paul Anton Esterházy de Galántha was born in Eisenstadt, Archduchy of Austria on 22 April 1711 as the son of Prince Joseph Anton Esterházy de Galántha (1688–1721) and his wife, born Baroness Maria Octavia von Gilleis zu Theras und Sonnenberg (1688–1762). He had three siblings, younger brother Nikolaus Joseph (1714–1790) and sisters Maria Josepha and Anne Maria. Prince Paul Anton studied in Vienna and Leiden and was very interested in culture. His father died when he was young, and the stewardship of the Esterházy was taken on by regents.

In August 1733, in London, he became a freemason:

On Tuesday last Prince Anthony Esterházy, lately arrived here, and another german Nobleman, a Relative to the Elector of Mentz, were admitted Free and Accepted Masons, at the French Lodge, held the first and third Tuesday of every Month, at the Duke of Lorraine's head in Suffolk Street. (Daily Advertiser, (London), 9 August 1733).

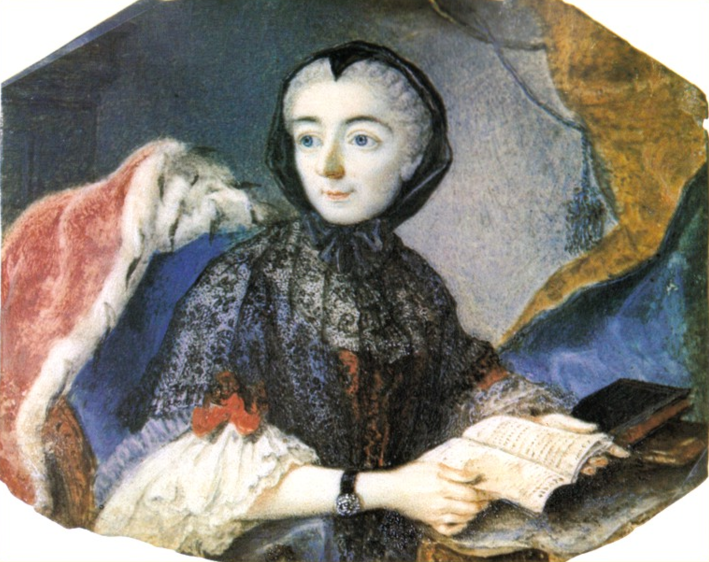
Prince Paul's wife, Maria Anna Lunati-Visconti, Dowager Princess Esterházy.

Paul Anton formally assumed the duties of office in 1734. As prince Paul Anton continued the historical policy of his family, namely that of supporting the Habsburg monarchy; in particular he supported the Habsburg Empress Maria Theresa of Austria in the War of the Austrian Succession. In this war (1741–1748), he led a regiment of hussars which he had raised himself. Because of his many successes on the battlefield, he was appointed Fieldmarshal-Lieutenant (German: de:Feldmarschall-Leutnant) in 1747 and was sent after the war as imperial envoy to Naples, where he stayed between 1750 and 1753.

At the outbreak of the Seven Years' War in 1756, he fought as a General of the Cavalry and was promoted to Field Marshal in 1758. He retired from military service that year. From then on he was involved in humanitarian and cultural activities.

According to the New Grove, Paul Anton could speak French and German, and "oversaw the Europeanization of the court at Eisenstadt. He also remodeled the gardens there, developed a large library, sponsored theatrical productions. A cultural project of particular interest was his 1761 project of reorganizing the musical staff at his court. He brought in new players, reassigned his aging Kapellmeister Gregor Werner to cover just church music, and appointed the young Joseph Haydn as Vice-Kapellmeister, in charge of the orchestra. Since this provided Haydn with his own orchestra, with ample opportunities to compose symphonies for it to perform, the appointment was of great consequence for the growing status of the symphony and thus for the history of music.

When Paul Anton died in Vienna in 1762 without children, he was succeeded by his brother Nikolaus.

== Notes ==
Paul II Anton, Prince Esterházy House of Esterházy Born: 22 April 1711 Died: 18 March 1762
Hungarian nobility
Preceded by Joseph	Prince Esterházy of Galántha; 6 June 1721 – 18 March 1762	Succeeded by Nikolaus I
