= Ferdinand Bonaventura I, Count Harrach =

Austrian statesman, diplomat and courtier

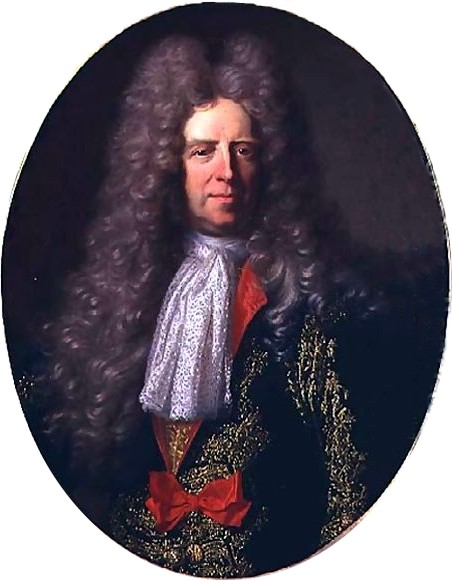
Ferdinand Bonaventura I Graf Harrach (1637-1706), ambassador in Spain (1698) by Hyacinthe Rigaud.

Ferdinand Bonaventura, Count of Harrach and Rohrau (German: Ferdinand Bonaventura Graf von Harrach zu Rohrau; 14 July 1637 – 15 June 1706) was an Austrian statesman, diplomat and courtier from the noble family of Harrach, Knight of the Order of the Golden Fleece and owner of estates in Austria and Bohemia. To distinguish him from his grandson of the same name, he is referred to in contemporary sources as Ferdinand Bonaventura I.

== Biography ==
He was the only son of Imperial Colonel Otto Friedrich Harrach (1610–1639) and his wife Lavinia Gonzaga-Novellara (1610–1639). His grandfather was Karl von Harrach (1570–1628). On his father's side he was the nephew of Albrecht von Wallenstein, and on his mother's side he was related to the family of the ruling Dukes of Mantua. At the time of the death of both parents he was a minor, the guardian became his uncle, Cardinal Ernst Adalbert von Harrach. From 1655 to 1657 he undertook a cavalier tour through France, Flanders and Germany. In 1658 he participated as Imperial Chamberlain in the coronation of Leopold I as Holy Roman Emperor in Frankfurt, then continued his travels in Italy.

After returning to Vienna, he took a prominent position at Court as a member of the Imperial Court Council (1663), and in 1661 he was awarded the Order of the Golden Fleece. As a diplomat, he represented the Emperor in Paris at the baptism of Louis XIV's second son Philippe Charles (1668-1671). He was Supreme Marshal of the Imperial Court from 1671 to 1674, and ambassador to Madrid from 1673 to 1677. After his return, he became Oberstallmeister (1677–1699) and was one of the most influential personalities of the Habsburg monarchy. From 1677 he was also a member of the Privy Council.

In 1697-1698 he led another diplomatic mission to Spain, where his task was to defend the interests of the Austrian Habsburgs against the expected extinction of the Spanish line. He wasn't successful in securing the Spanish succession for the Austrian line, which would eventually result in the Spanish War of Succession (1700-1714).
After his return, he finished his career as the Obersthofmeister (1699–1705), in this position he also took over the chairmanship of the Privy Council and at the end of the reign of Leopold I determined the direction of foreign policy.

He lost his position after the accession of Joseph I, who replaced most high state offices by confidants.
Harrach died during a medical stay in Karlovy Vary at the age of 69, and is buried in the Church of St. Augustine in Vienna.

=== Marriage and Children ===
His prominent position at Court also resulted from his marriage to Countess Johanna Theresia von Lamberg (1639–1716), member of an influential House of Lamberg, daughter of statesman Johann Maximilian von Lamberg (1608–1682) and his wife, Countess Judith Rebecca Eleonore von Würben und Freudenthal (1612-1690). They married in Madrid, where Johanna Theresa served as lady-in-waiting to the Queen of Spain.
The marriage produced nine children:

- Karl Graf von Harrach (1662-1686), killed during the Siege of Buda (1686), no issue.
- Maria Josepha von Harrach (1663-1741), married Count Johann Joseph von Küenburg (1652-1726)
- Franz Anton von Harrach (1665–1727), Archbishop of Salzburg
- Maximilian von Harrach (1666-1668), died in infancy
- Aloys Thomas Raimund, Count Harrach (1669–1742), Viceroy of Naples, had issue
- Johann Camillo von Harrach (1671-1671), died as a baby
- Franz von Harrach (1672-1672), died a day after his birth
- Rosa Angela von Harrach (1674-1742), married Count Philipp Karl Emanuel von Buquoy (1690-1703)
- Johann Philipp von Harrach (1678–1764), Field Marshal and President of the Court War Council, no issue

== Sources ==
- BLKÖ:Harrach, Ferdinand Bonaventura (I.)
- Deutsche Biographie: Harrach, Ferdinand Bonaventura Graf von
- ADB:Harrach, Ferdinand Bonaventura Graf von
