= Johanna Theresia Lamberg =

Austrian noblewoman (1639–1716)

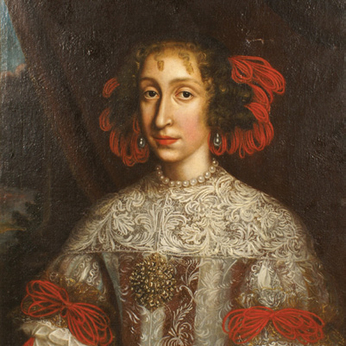
Portrait of Countess Johanna Theresia von Lamberg, (17th century)

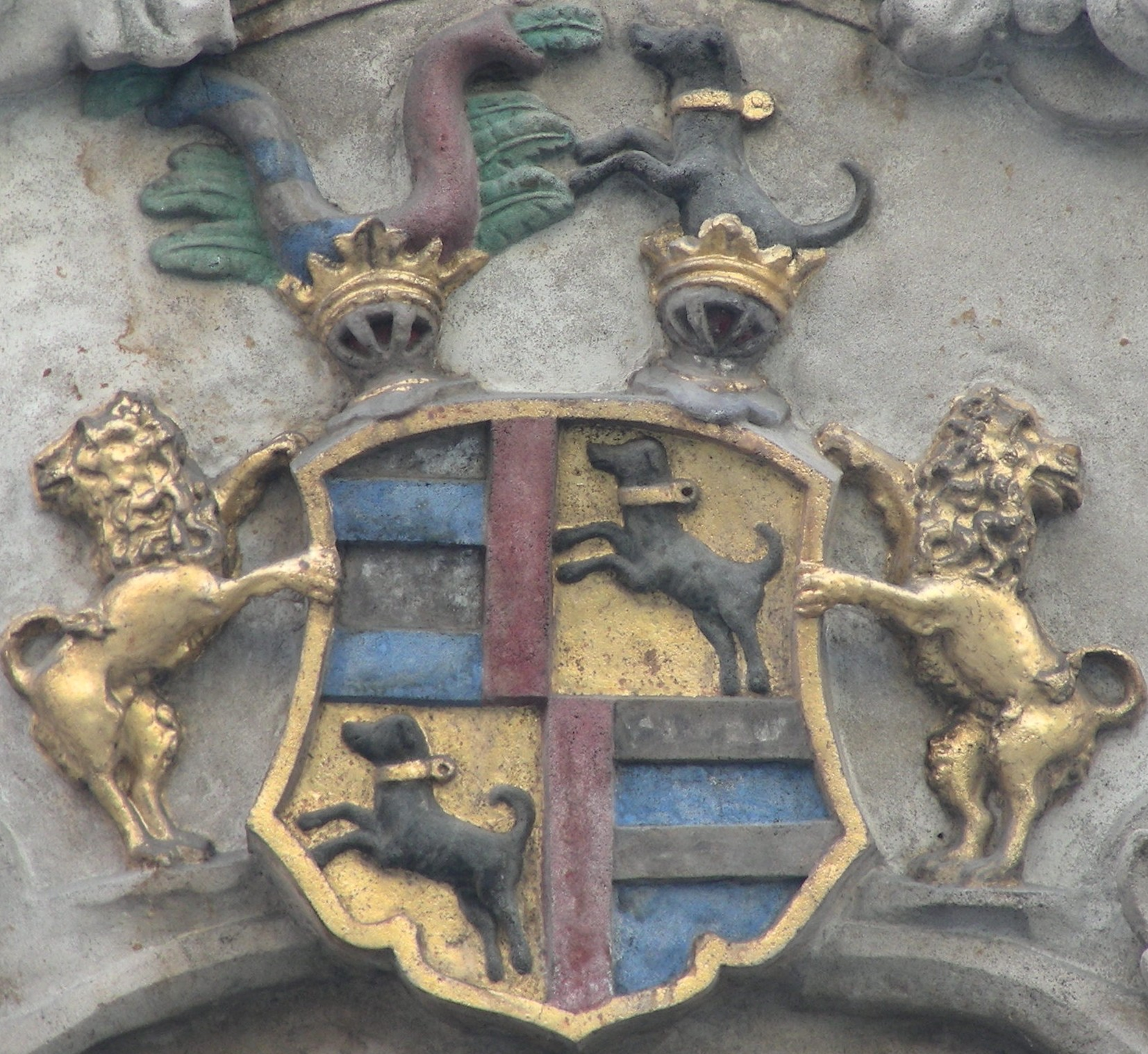
Coat of arms of the House of Lamberg (1655)

Countess Johanna Theresia von Lamberg (1639–1716), was an Austrian noblewoman and a Spanish court official.

== Early life ==
Born into an old Austrian House of Lamberg, she was the second child and the eldest daughter of a diplomat and courtier, Count Johann Maximilian Nepomuk von Lamberg-Steyr and his wife, Countess Judith Rebecca Eleonore von Würben und Freudenthal (1612-1690).

== Court life ==
She was a lady-in-waiting and favorite of the queen regent of Spain, Mariana of Austria, in 1653–60, with whom she corresponded until Mariana's death.

She was married to Ferdinand Bonaventura I, Count von Harrach (1637-1706), an Imperial ambassador to Spain in 1673–76, and played an important role as a mediator and channel for the sale of offices as well as in the diplomatic service, particularly concerning the proposed arranged marriage between the Charles II of Spain and Archduchess Maria Antonia of Austria.

== Private life ==
On October 28, 1662, she married Count Ferdinand Bonaventura I von Harrach zu Rohrau, member of an equally old House of Harrach, confidant of Emperor Leopold I. They had 9 children, seven sons and two daughters.

Among them were Franz Anton, Fürst von Harrach and his younger brothers Johann Philipp von Harrach and Aloys Thomas Raimund, Count von Harrach.
