= Franz Anton von Harrach =

Spanish priest who ruled as Prince-Archbishop of Salzburg

His Princely Grace Franz Anton von Harrach
- Prince-Archbishop of Salzburg
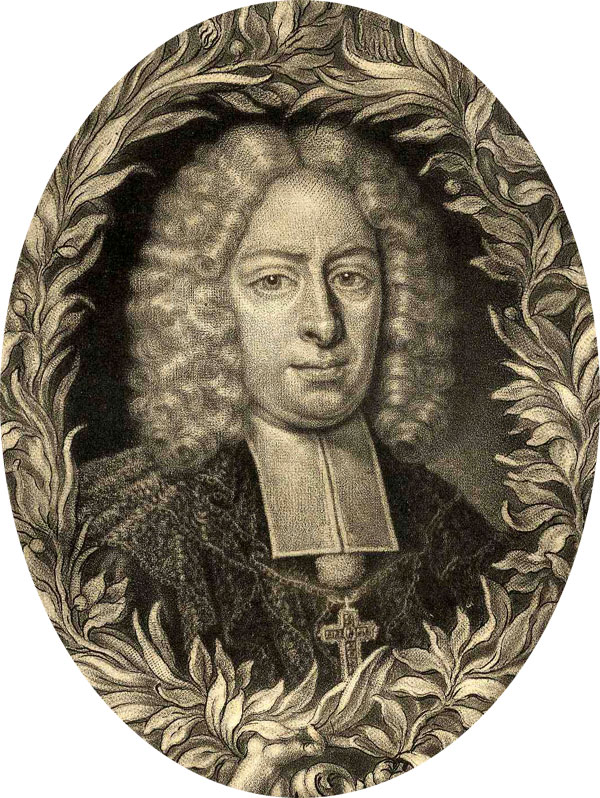
- Portrait of Franz Anton von Harrach as Prince-Archbishop of Salzburg
- Church: Roman Catholic Church
- Archdiocese: Salzburg
- See: Cathedral of Saints Rupert and Vergilius
- Installed: 20 April 1709
- Term ended: 19 July 1727
- Predecessor: Johann Ernst von Thun und Hohenstein
- Successor: Leopold Anton von Firmian
- Other posts: Titular Bishop of Epiphania (1701–02); Prince-Bishop of Vienna (1702–06)

Personal details
- Born: 2 October 1665 Vienna, Austria, Holy Roman Empire
- Died: 18 July 1727 (aged 61) Salzburg, Archbishopric of Salzburg, Holy Roman Empire
- Education: Collegium Germanicum et Hungaricum, Rome

Franz Anton Fürst von Harrach zu Rorau (born 2 October 1665, Vienna – 18 July 1727, Salzburg) was appointed coadjutor of Vienna and Titular Bishop of Epiphania in Syria in 1701, was from 1702 to 1705 Prince-Bishop of Vienna, 1705 coadjutor of Salzburg, and ruled from 1709 to 1727. He was considered one of the most notable Prince-Archbishops of Salzburg.

== Biography ==
=== Early life ===
Franz Anton was the son of Ferdinand Bonaventure Graf von Harrach (1637-1706), confidant of Emperor Leopold I, and his wife, Countess Johanna Theresia von Lamberg. His younger brothers were Aloys Thomas Raimund von Harrach (1669-1742), the progenitor of the younger, Silesian line of the House of Harrach, and Johann Philipp von Harrach, a Fieldmarshal.

Franz Anton grew up in Madrid, studied canon and civil law at the Pontificium Collegium Germanicum et Hungaricum de Urbe in Rome, and was raised in 1706 by Joseph I ad personam to the rank of Fürst.

=== Ecclesiastical career ===
In 1685, Franz Anton was canon in Passau. In 1687, the canon in Salzburg, and 1692 there dean. Emperor Leopold I appointed him coadjutor of Vienna in July 1701, the Papal confirmation taking place on 1 December. He was also Titular Bishop of Epiphania. When Prince-Bishop Ernest Graf von Trautson died on 7 January 1702, Harrach became his successor and received the episcopal ordination by Johann Philipp von Lamberg, Prince-Bishop of Passau. On 19 October 1705, he was appointed coadjutor of the Prince-Archbishop of Salzburg, Johann Ernst von Thun und Hohenstein, and confirmed in April 1706 by the Pope. After the death of Thun und Hohenstein, he was on 29 May 1709 made reigning Prince-Archbishop of Salzburg.

Franz Anton was benevolent, affable, and popular as prince-bishop. he loved pageantry and had the Mirabell Palace considerably enlarged and renewed. The result was an impressive Rococo staircase and marble hall. From 1710 to 1711, he had the Salzburg residence renewed. His reign was calm overall, even contemporaries spoke of the "Golden Age of Harrach". His artistic sense, which was characterized by the Late Baroque, is especially praised. He employed well-known artists for the execution of the plans at great cost. The architects were Johann Bernhard Fischer von Erlach and Johann Lucas von Hildebrandt, sculptor Georg Raphael Donner, painters Johann Michael Rottmayr and Martino Altomonte.

Prince-Bishop Harrach endeavored to promote business and commerce as a source of prosperity. For trading in Venice and the Mediterranean, he had the major trade routes extended. He lies buried in the crypt of Salzburg Cathedral.

== Bibliography ==
- Christoph Brandhuber: Recreatio principis. Fürsterzbischof Franz Anton Fürst von Harrach und seine „Retirade“ In: Vision und Realität. Die Salzburger Residenz 1587–1727 Österreichische Zeitschrift für Kunst und Denkmalpflege [ÖZKD] LXIII, 2009, Heft 1/2. Horn/Wien 2009, S. 118–125.
- Christoph Brandhuber, Werner Rainer: Ein Fürst führt Tagebuch. Die „Notata“ des Salzburger Fürsterzbischofs Franz Anton Fürsten von Harrach (1665-1727). In: Salzburg Archiv 34 (2010), S. 205–262.
- Franz Loidl: Geschichte des Erzbistums Wien. Herold, Wien 1983. ISBN 3-7008-0223-4.
- Ernst Tomek: Kirchengeschichte Österreichs. Tyrolia, Innsbruck – Wien – München 1935–1959.
- Imma Walderdorff: Zu den Gemäldegalerien in der Residenz unter Fürsterzbischof Franz Anton Fürst von Harrach. In: Vision und Realität. Die Salzburger Residenz 1587–1727 Österreichische Zeitschrift für Kunst und Denkmalpflege [ÖZKD] LXIII, 2009, Heft 1/2. Horn/Wien 2009, S. 139–153.
- Imma Walderdorff, Roswitha Juffinger: Rekonstruktion der Bilder-Hängung eines Wandabschnitts der „Schönen Galerie“ In: Vision und Realität. Die Salzburger Residenz 1587–1727 Österreichische Zeitschrift für Kunst und Denkmalpflege [ÖZKD] LXIII, 2009, Heft 1/2. Horn/Wien 2009, S. 154–156.
- Josef Wodka: Kirche in Österreich. Wegweiser durch ihre Geschichte. Herder, Wien 1959.

Religious titles
Preceded by Johann Ernst von Thun und Hohenstein	Archbishop of Salzburg; 1709–1727	Succeeded by Leopold Anton von Firmian
