= History of Hungarians in Vienna =

The city of Vienna, Austria is home to a long-established Hungarian community dating back to the 1500s. Beginning in the 17th century, Vienna became an important cultural center for Hungarians. During the time of the Austro-Hungarian Empire (1867-1918) and the early 1990s, Hungarians were the second largest non-German speaking population in Vienna after the Czechs. After the dissolution of the Austro-Hungarian Empire, many of the Viennese Hungarians returned to Hungary. Today, Vienna is home to a small Hungarian population of around 27,000.

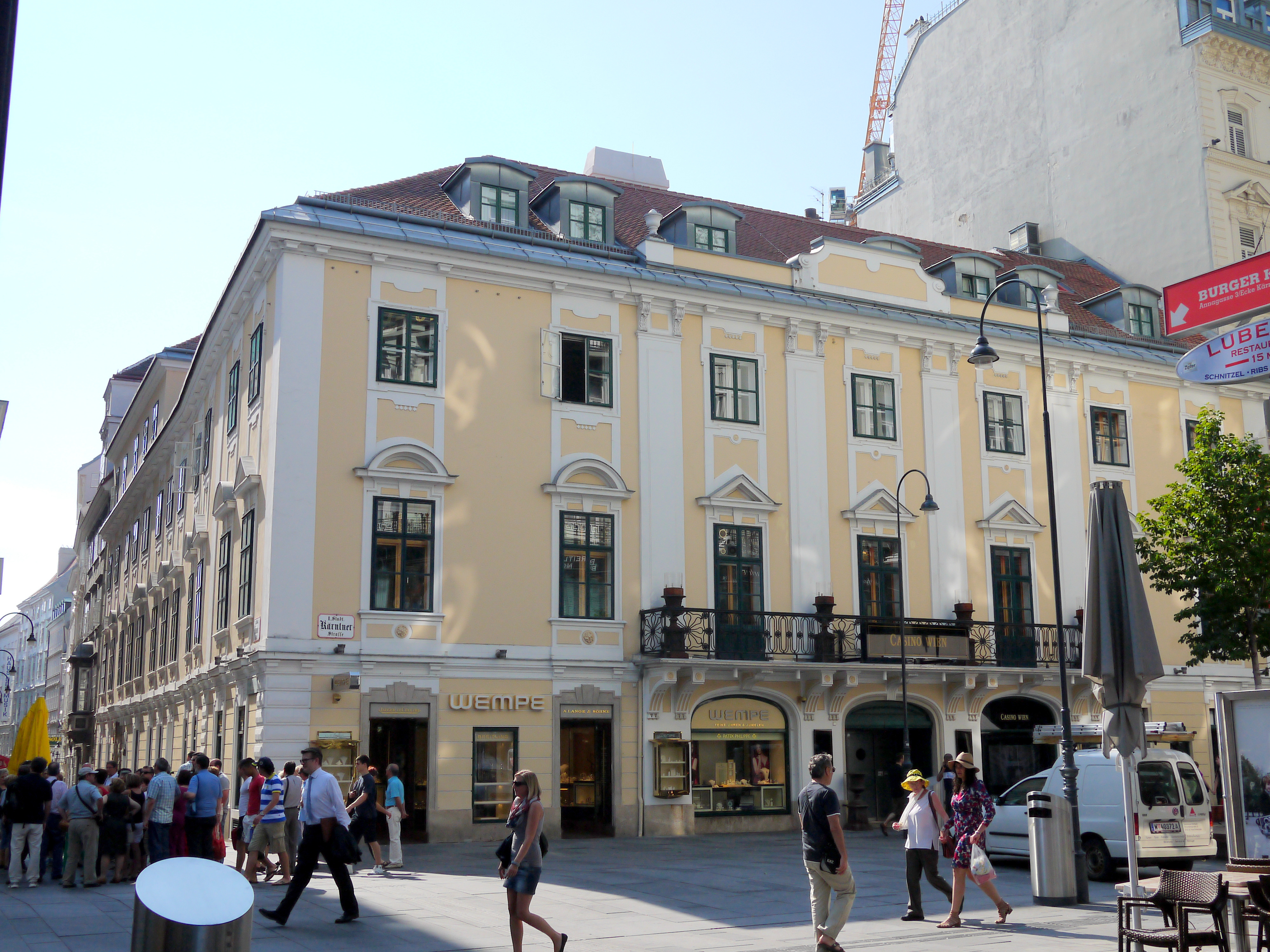
Esterházy Palace, one of the city's several preserved residences of Hungarian noble families

== History ==
Vienna, known in Hungarian as Bécs, was the seat of the Royal Court of King Matthias Corvinus of Hungary in 1485–1490. Hungarians established a community in Vienna from 1541 following the 1526 battle of Mohács. Towards the end of the 17th century the city became a key cultural center for Hungarians. Hungarian students graduated from the Vienna University and from the 17th century onwards there was an increasing influx of Hungarian craftsmen into Vienna. In 1760, the Hungarian Royal Guard was established in Vienna and located in the Palais Trautson. The first cultural associations were set up in Vienna in the 1860s. 130,300 residents of Vienna in 1910 were citizens of the Hungarian part of the empire, while only 45,000 of them were also ethnically Hungarians. After World War I a re-emigration started. In censuses of the Interwar period Hungarians counted between 1000-2000 people. In 1920 the Hungarian Historical Institute in Vienna was founded, and in 1924 the Collegium Hungaricum was founded, both originally located in the Palais Trautson. After World War II the population sharply decreased again, as the Soviets used force to repatriate key workers of Hungarian or Czech origin to return to their ethnic homelands to further the Soviet Bloc economy. However, refugees from Hungary increased the numbers again in 1945, 1948 and 1956.

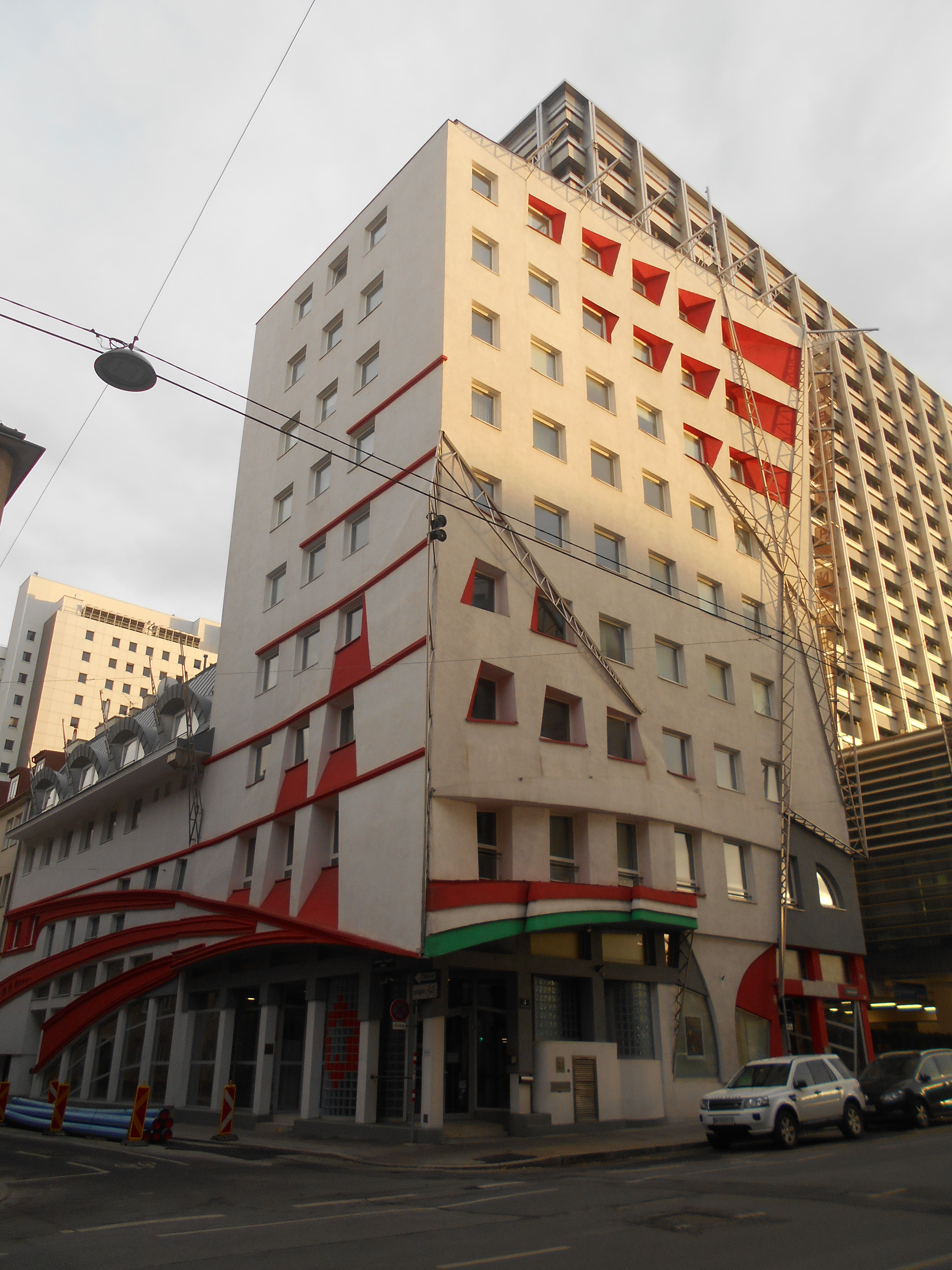
Collegium Hungaricum

The city has a number of historic residences and palaces of Hungarian nobility, including of the Esterházy, Pálffy, Batthyány, Apponyi and Erdődy families.

In the 2010s, according to the Jewish Telegraphic Agency, a number of Hungarian Jews have left Hungary due to antisemitism and economic woes and resettled in Vienna. The Viennese Jewish community has encouraged Hungarian Jews from Budapest to resettle in Vienna due to fears over the rise of the far-right Jobbik party, a climate of nationalism and xenophobia, and an economic recession. Disagreement exists within Jewish communities in Austria and Hungary over the extent to which Hungarian-Jewish emigration from Hungary is due to economic problems or due to antisemitism.

As of 2017, Vienna was home to almost 27,000 Hungarians.

== See also ==
- Hungarians in Austria
