= Burg Ottenstein =

Castle in Lower Austria

Coordinates: 48°35′47″N 15°20′08″E

- Lower Austria, Austria
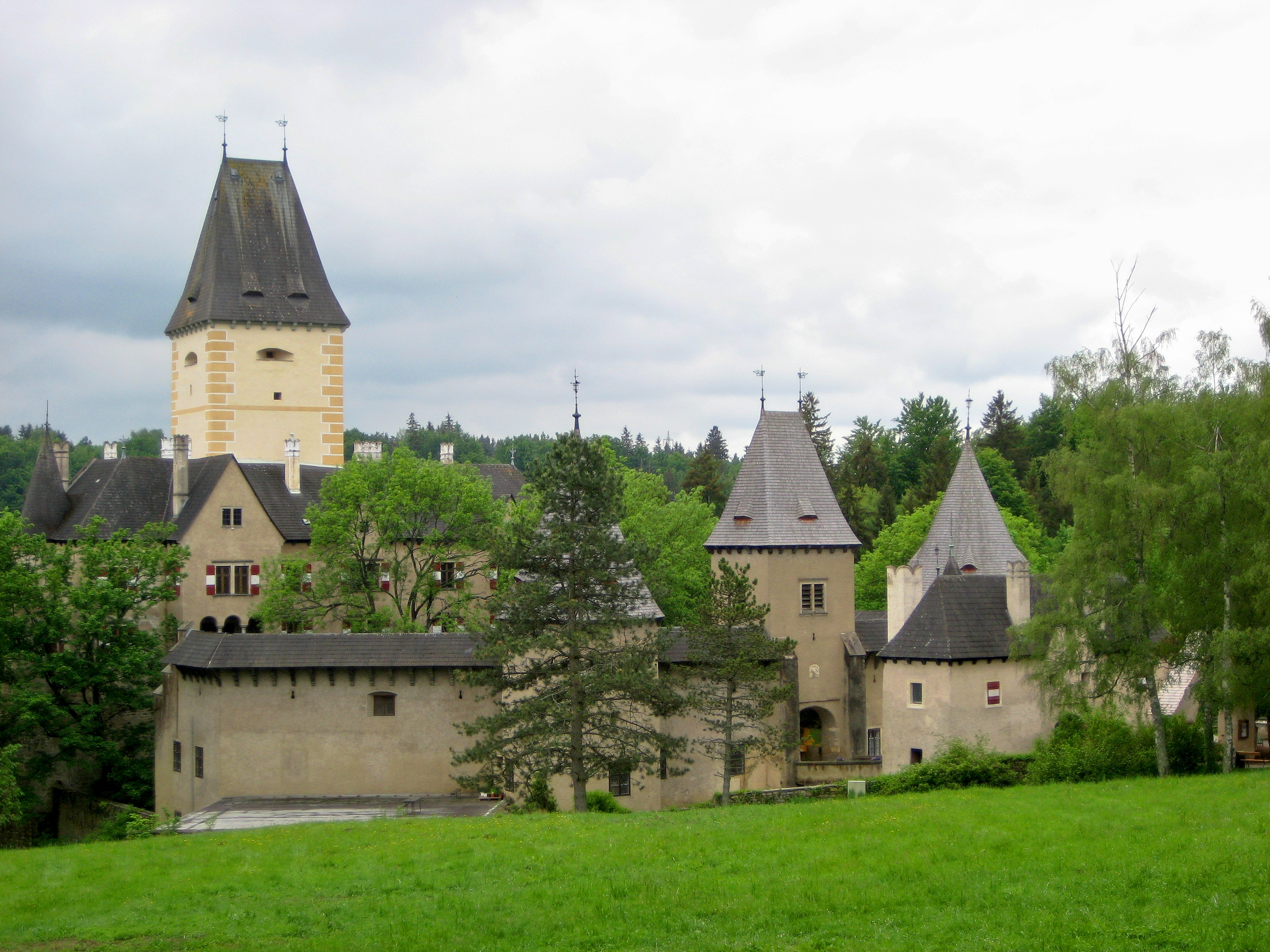
- Burg Ottenstein

Site information
- Type: Castle

Burg Ottenstein is a castle in Lower Austria, Austria. Burg Ottenstein is 503 metres (1,650 ft) above sea level. It was first referenced in 1177, and was later restored by the Counts of Lamberg in 1624.

== See also ==
- List of castles in Austria
