= Aufschnaiter =

Aufschnaiter is a German surname. Notable people with the surname include:

- Benedikt Anton Aufschnaiter (1665–1742), Austrian composer
- Peter Aufschnaiter (1899–1973), Austrian mountaineer, agricultural scientist, geographer, and cartographer
