= Anton Franz de Paula Graf Lamberg-Sprinzenstein =

Austrian politician, art collector (1740–1822)

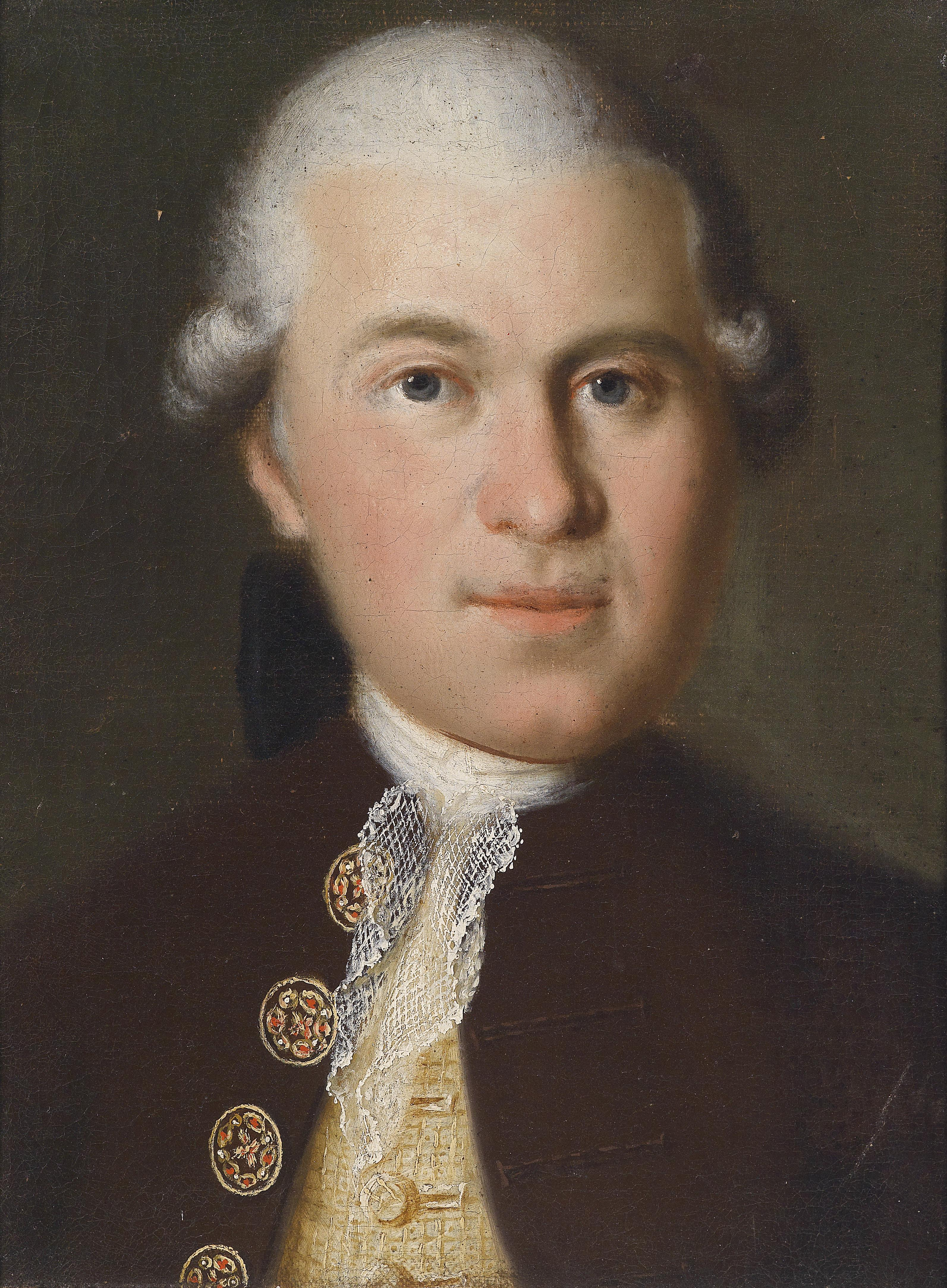
- Born: 1740; Vienna, Habsburg monarchy
- Died: 1822 (aged 81–82); Vienna, Austrian Empire

Anton Franz de Paula Graf Lamberg-Sprinzenstein (1740–1822) was an Austrian diplomat and art collector. He was memober of the Lamberg-Sprinzenstein noble family.

== Early life ==
Anton Franz was born in Vienna as the eldest son of Count Franz de Paula Anton Flavius von Lamberg (1707–1765) and his second wife, Countess Maria Josefa Eleonora Esterházy von Galántha (1712–1756).

== Biography ==
During his diplomatic career he spent six years in Naples where he collected over 500 ancient Greek vases that he later donated in 1815 to the Cabinet of Antiquities in Vienna (now part of the Kunsthistorisches Museum there). In 1807 he became an honorary member of the Academy of Fine Arts in Vienna and in 1818, after retiring from the diplomatic service, he bequeathed to the Academy his entire painting collection, including works by Titian, Velasquez, Guardi, Rembrandt, Jan van Goyen, Jacob van Ruisdael, and many others. Today his collection forms the main component of the Picture Gallery of the Academy of Fine Arts Vienna.

Lamberg-Sprinzenstein died in Vienna. He has never married and did not have children.
