= Hans Mollard von Reinek =

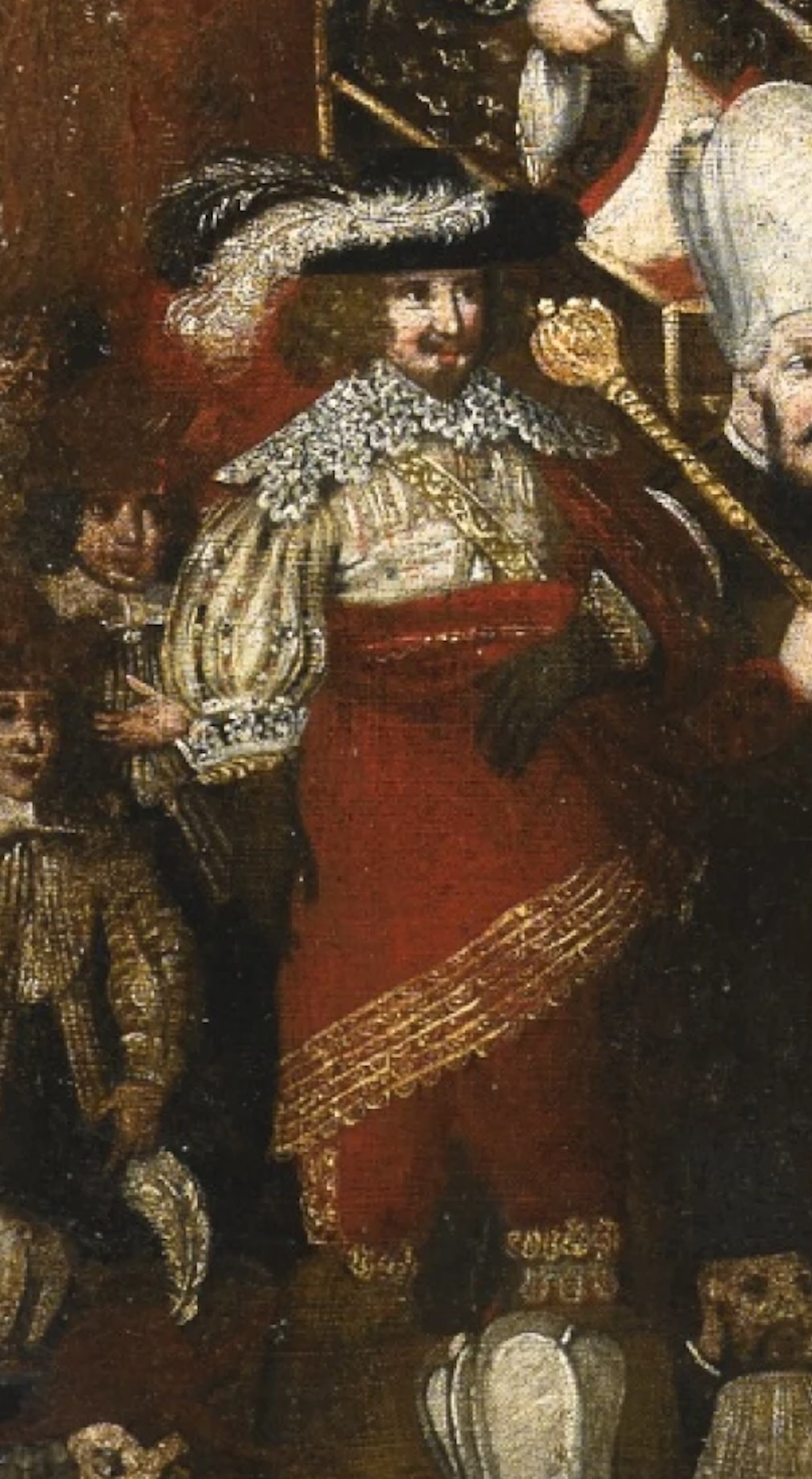
Austrian ambassador to the Porte, Baron Hans Mollard von Reinek, in 1618, Istanbul

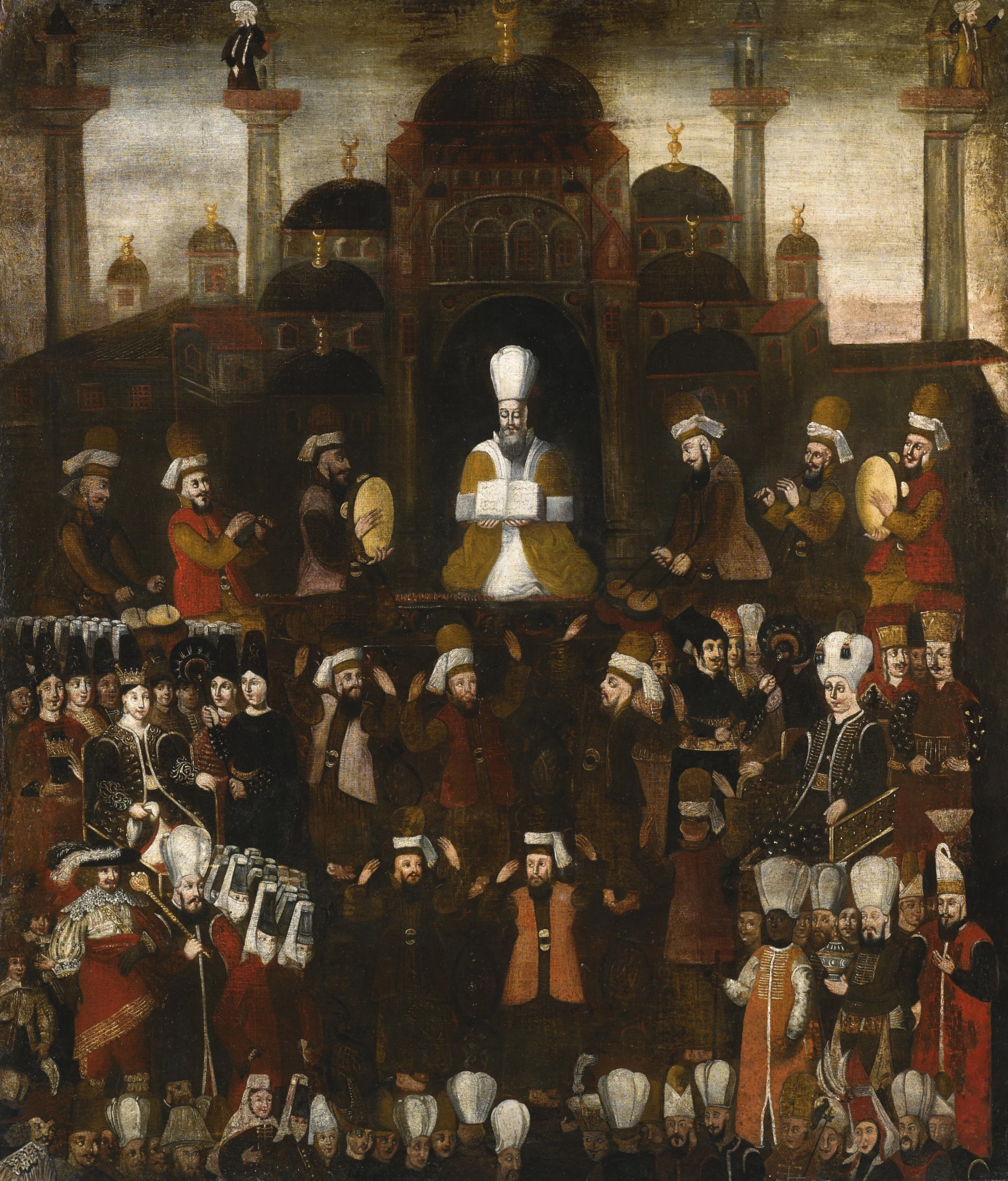
Hans Mollard von Reinek among the attendants at the coronation of Osman II

Baron Hans Mollard von Reinek, or Hanns von Mollard (1563-July 1619, Vienna), was Austrian ambassador at the Ottoman Porte in Istanbul in the early 17th century. He attended the coronation of Sultan Osman II in Istambul, and appears in a painting of the period.

Hans Mollard was Baron of Reineck and Drosendorf and Imperial Field Marshal, General, Land and House Ordnance Master, President of the Imperial War Council (1610–1619), Privy Councillor, Chamberlain and Colonel of the Vienna City Guard.

His parents were the knight Peter von Mollard († 15 April 1576) of Reineck and Drosendorf, who was raised to the rank of baron in 1571, and his wife Anna von Castelamphi († 29 March 1591). Hanns had two brothers: Ernst († 1620) and Peter Ernst.

Mollard participated in a diplomatic mission to Constantinople in 1589. This mission delivered to the Sultan the Emperor's last annual honorary gift, worth 30,000 ducats.

On January 30, 1594, Archduke Ernst entered Brussels. Mollard is listed as the leader of the Imperial Guard . In 1599, he was appointed to the Imperial War Council. In 1602, he was sent to the main army in Altenburg. Commissioned by Emperor Matthias, he procured military equipment there and also prepared the border fortresses of Uivar, Komárom, and Győr for combat. Subsequently, in 1606, he became the Emperor's negotiator in talks with the Ottomans. A conclusion was reached on November 11, 1606, and the Treaty of Zsitva-Dorog was ratified on December 9. In this treaty, the Sultan recognized for the first time the Emperor's sovereignty over parts of Hungary, so that the Emperor was referred to as King of Hungary rather than King of Vienna.

Mollard enjoyed the emperor's confidence; when the emperor traveled to Pressburg in 1609, Mollard was appointed commandant of Vienna. In 1610, he was appointed president of the Imperial War Council. In 1612, a controversy arose with Cardinal Khlesl, the director of the Privy Council. Against Khlesl's wishes, Mollard had stationed German troops in Hungarian fortresses, but he was able to prevail over Khlesl's decision.

In 1613, the Emperor traveled to Regensburg. Archduke Ferdinand was to represent him at home; Mollard was also appointed to his advisory council. His task was "the Hungarian, Transylvanian, and Turkish affairs," the most important part of the revenues, which he carried out to the Emperor's satisfaction. On September 3, 1614, he was appointed Privy Councilor for this work. However, his old enemy Khlesl succeeded in taking over the Turkish affairs in 1614, and in 1615 he also tried to keep Mollard away from further negotiations with the Ottomans. The outbreak of the Thirty Years' War ended Cardinal Khlesl's ambitions. Thus, Mollard negotiated with the Ottoman ambassador.

When Osman II seized power in Constantinople in 1619, Mollard was sent by the Emperor as ambassador to Constantinople to congratulate the new Sultan. However, Mollard died shortly after his return to Vienna.

Mollard married Veronica von Holleneck on July 5, 1593. The marriage remained childless.

== Sources ==
- Heraldisch genealogischer Zeitschrift, 1871, S. 168
- Berichte und Mitteilungen des Altertums-Vereines zu Wien, Band 3, S. 35
- Karl Ritter von Schönhals, Die Hofkriegsraths-Präsidenten und Kriegsminister der k.k. österreichischen Armee, 1874, S. 7
