= Aleksander Benedykt Sobieski =

Son of John III Sobieski, King of Poland

- Prince of Poland
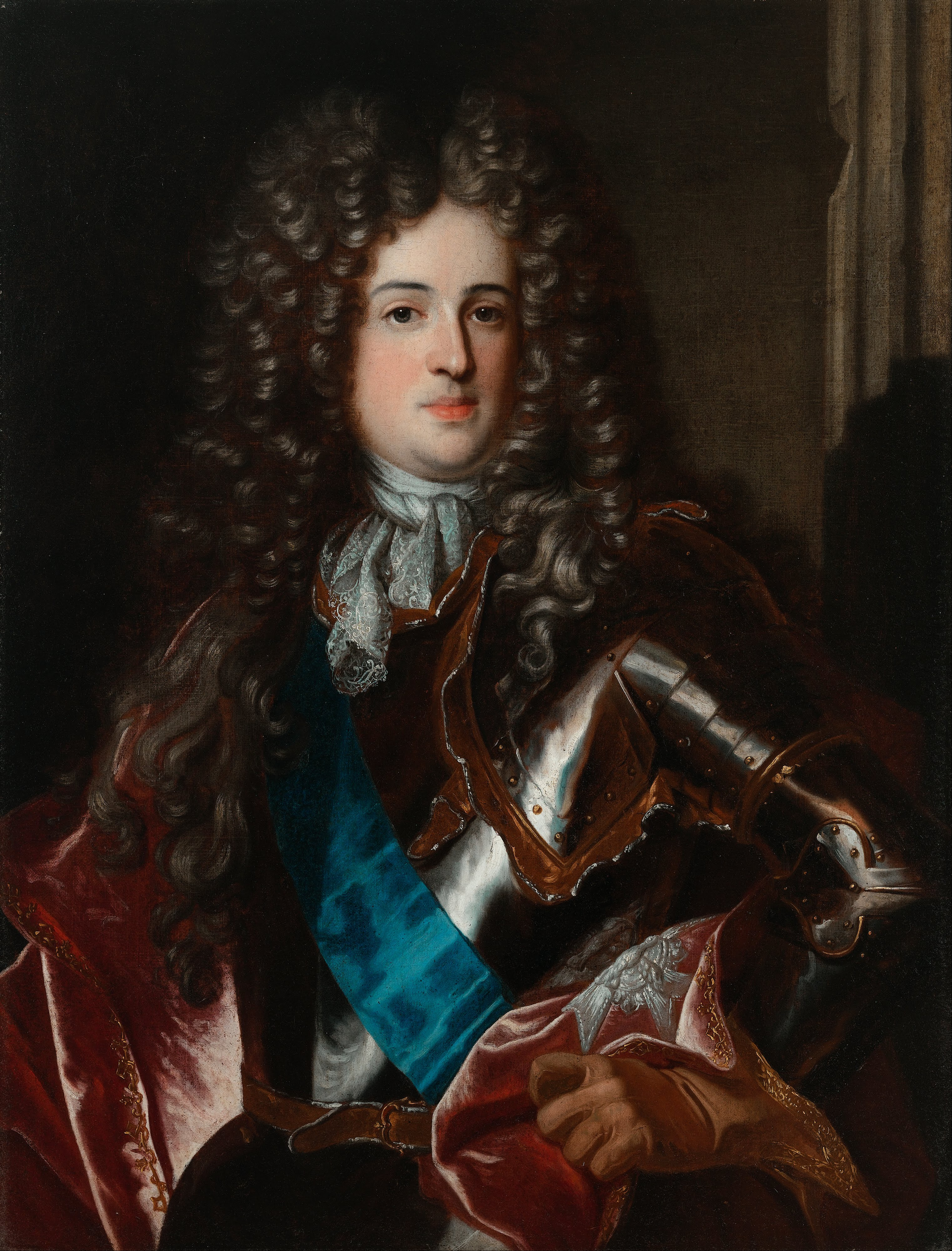
- Painting by Hyacinthe Rigaud
- Born: 9 September 1677; Gdańsk, Kingdom of Poland, Polish-Lithuanian Commonwealth
- Died: 16 November 1714 (aged 37); Rome, Papal States
- House: Sobieski
- Father: John III Sobieski
- Mother: Marie Casimire Louise de la Grange d'Arquien

Aleksander Benedykt Stanisław Sobieski (Polish pronunciation: [alɛˈksandɛr bɛˈnɛdɨkt staˈɲiswaf sɔˈbjɛskʲi]; 9 September 1677 – 16 November 1714) was a Polish prince, nobleman, diplomat, writer, scholar and the son of John III Sobieski, King of Poland, and his wife, Marie Casimire Louise de la Grange d'Arquien.

He was a candidate for election to the Polish throne in 1697, following his father's death, but was unsuccessful. In 1702, he declined Charles XII of Sweden's offer to set him up as a rival king to Augustus II of Poland. He died in Rome in 1714, having recently become a Capuchin friar.

== Early life and studies ==
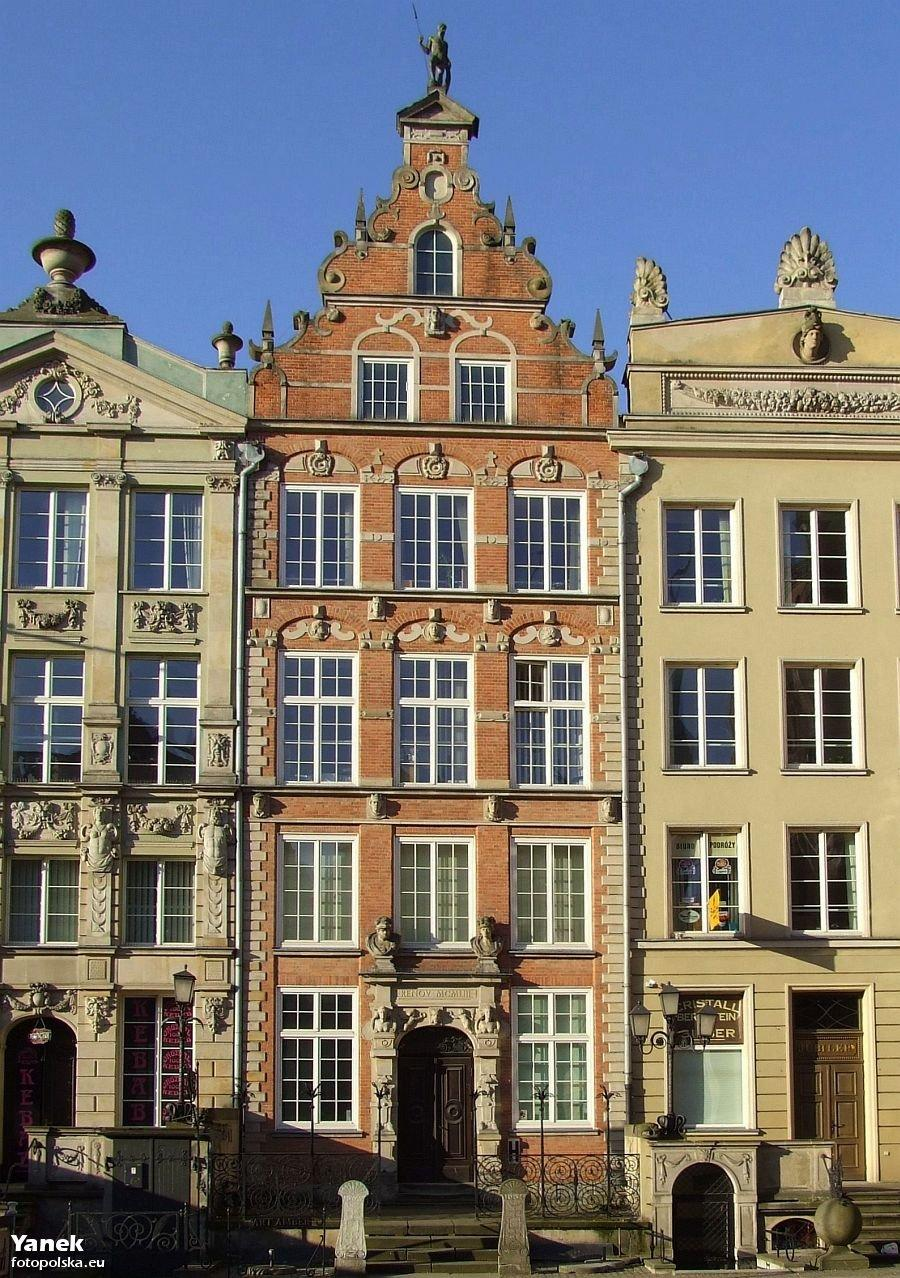
Birthplace of Aleksander Benedykt Sobieski in Gdańsk

In childhood he was highly educated, and learned to fluently speak several languages. In 1691 he accompanied his father on a military expedition to Moldavia.

In October 1696, while in Paris, he requested an audition with Louis XIV as the marquis of Jarosław. Following his father's death in 1696, Sobieski was presented to the nobility in 1697 as a candidate for election to the Polish throne, as John III had conflicted with his eldest son Jakub. Sobieski was not successful, and following this, he was not involved in politics to any great degree.

On January 19, 1698, together with his brother, Konstanty Władysław Sobieski, he organized a ball in Warsaw, in the honor of the newly crowned king Augustus II the Strong. During Augustus II's September campaign against the Tatars, Sobieski was likely a part of the king's camp. Sobieski was a constant companion to his mother from 1696 to 1698.

In November 1698, he and his mother were received by Emperor Leopold I and Eleonora Magdalena von Pfalz-Neuburg during her travels to Italy.

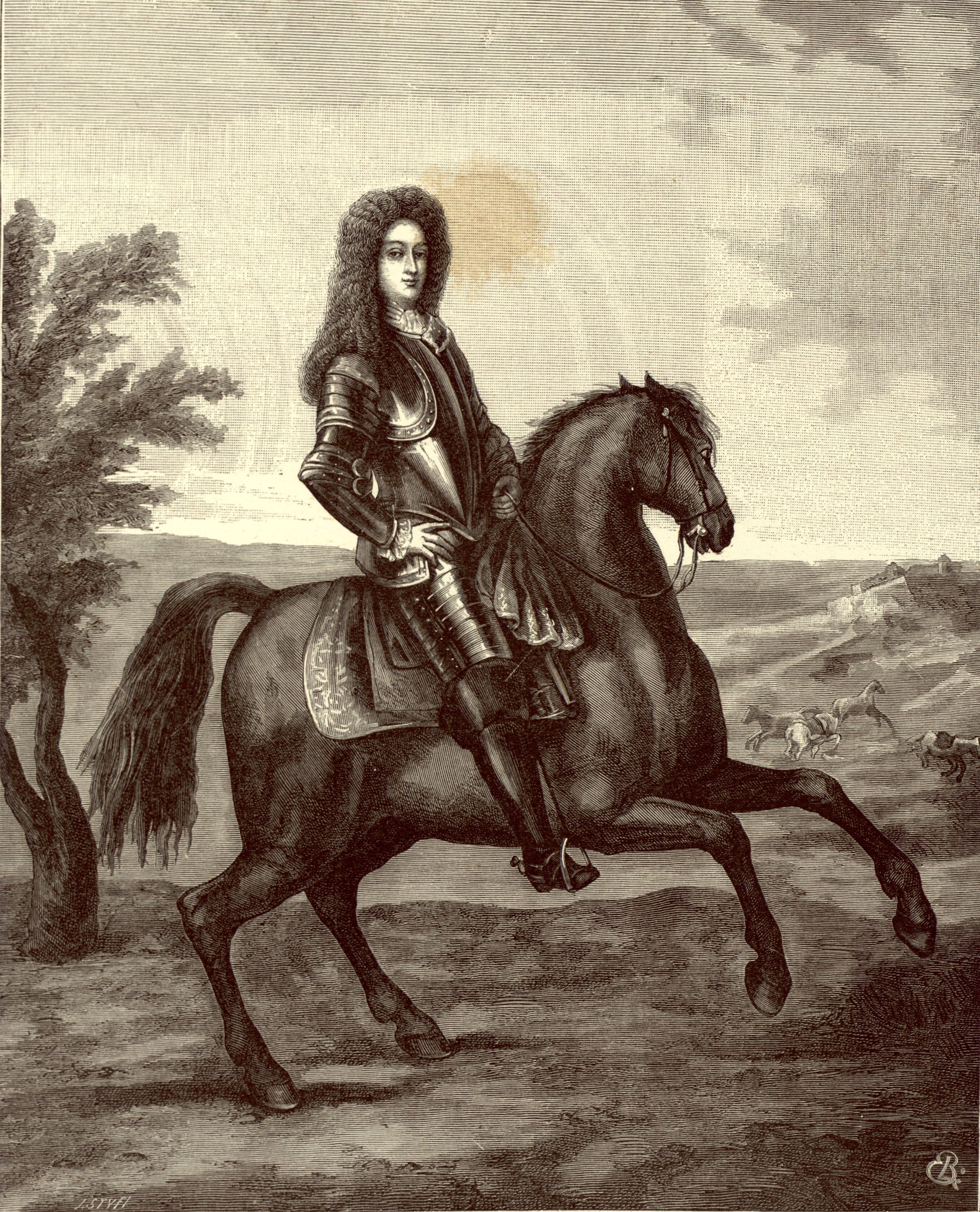
Aleksander Benedykt Sobieski

== Politics and military career ==
In March, 1700, he arrived in Rome and was made a Knight of the Order of St. Michael. In December, from the hands of the French ambassador, then Prince Louis of Monaco, he received the Order of the Holy Spirit. In summer of 1702, Charles de Caradas, the Marquis du Heron, a member of the Sejm (parliament) in Poland, suggested that Alexander should be seated on the throne of Hungary. Later that year the prince remained in Oława and he didn't accompany his brothers in an expedition to Saxony, however he did travel to Wrocław where he had an affair with the former mistress of Augustus II, Anna Aloysia Esterle.

Aleksander fought at the side of Charles XII during his campaign in Saxony, in 1706. After the release of his brothers under the terms of the Treaty of Altranstädt, he halted his engagement in politics.

== The arts, later life and death ==
In 1710 he settled in Rome. In 1709, under the pseudonym Armonte Calidio, he joined the Roman academy Arcadia and the congregation of writers, artists and scholars. During the meetings held in the Arcadian Roman Mansion he often recited his own poetry written in Latin. Aleksander throughout his life was passionate about theater. He created his own version of the Arcadian dramma nobile. In the years 1710-1713 he completed the composition of several operas, in collaboration with the composer Domenico Scarlatti and set designer Filippo Juvarra.

A ship from Gdańsk, Printz Alexander von Pohlen, was named after him.

Sobieski died in 1714 and was buried in the Roman Capuchin Crypt.

== Ancestry ==
Marek Sobieski
Jakub Sobieski
Jadwiga Snopkowska
John III Sobieski
Jan Daniłowicz
Zofia Teofila Daniłowicz
Zofia Żółkiewska
Aleksander Benedykt Sobieski
Antoine de La Grange d'Arquien
Henri Albert de La Grange d'Arquien
Anne d'Ancienville
Marie Casimire Louise
Baptiste de La Châtre of Bruillebault
Françoise de La Châtre
Gabrielle Lamy
