= Maximilian von und zu Trauttmansdorff =

Austrian politician and diplomat

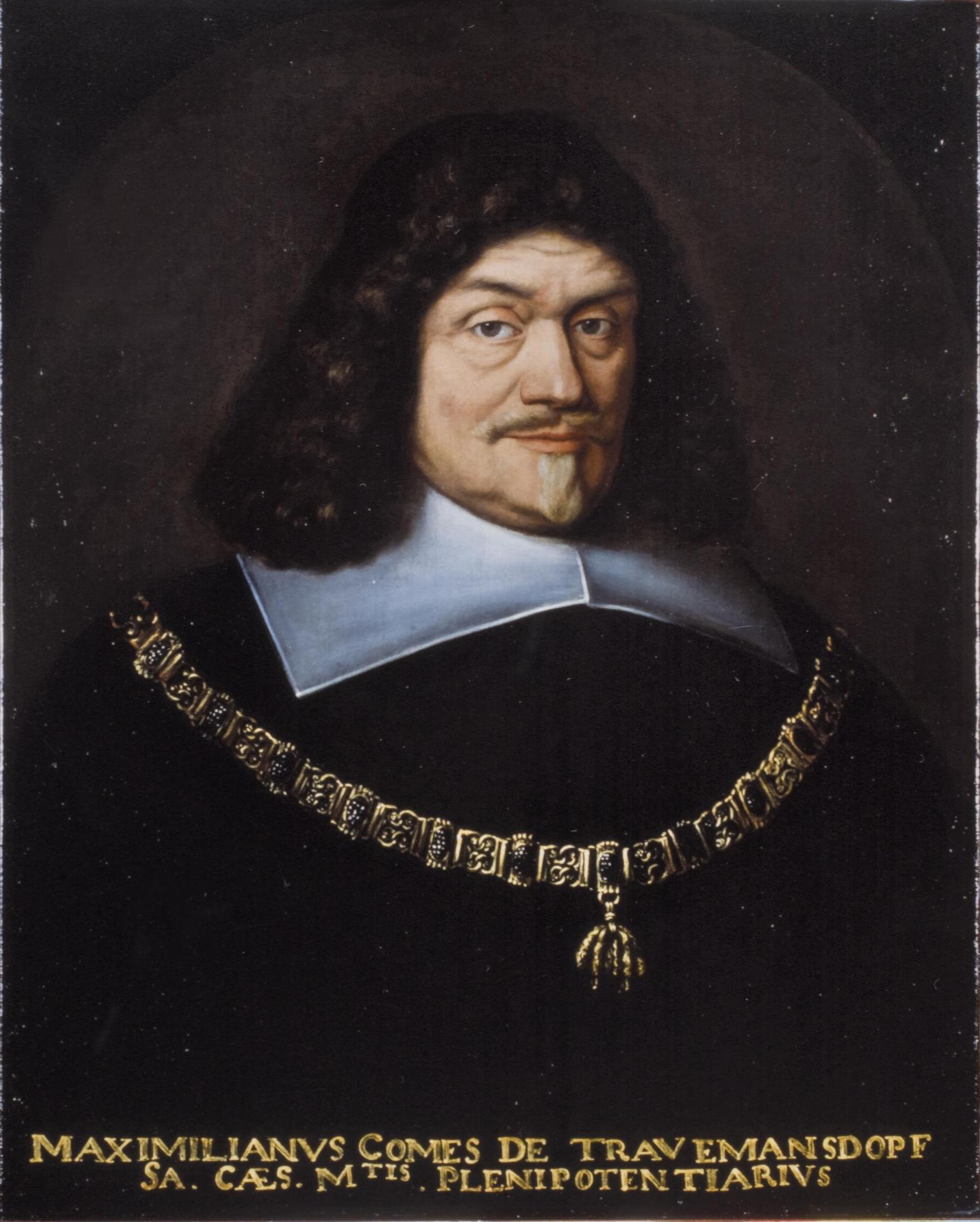
Maximilian von und zu Trauttmansdorff

Maximilian Freiherr von und zu Trauttmansdorff (23 May 1584, in Graz – 8 June 1650, in Vienna), (from 1623 Reichsgraf von und zu Trauttmansdorff) was an Austrian politician and diplomat of the Thirty Years' War era. His other titles included Freiherr von Gleichenberg, Neuenstadt am Kocher, Negau, Burgau und Totzenbach, Herr zu Teinitz. He was a Knight in the Order of the Golden Fleece, Geheimer Rat, Chancellor and Obersthofmeister.

As a long-term counsellor to emperors Ferdinand II and especially to Ferdinand III, he was a leading figure in governing the Empire and the Austrian Erblande. Concluding many treaties for the Empire, he was a principal architect of the Peace of Westphalia where he was the head of the Imperial delegation.

== Early life ==
Maximilian Johann was born as son of Johann Friedrich, Freiherr von Trauttmansdorff (1542-1614) and his wife Eva von Trauttmansdorff zum Freienthurn und Castelalt (b. 1549), who belonged to the other line of Trauttmansdorff family. Apart from his elder brother Johann David (d. 1627), he had sisters Susanna (d. 1620) and Elisabeth (1587-1653), who both married into House of Sinzendorf.

== Biography ==
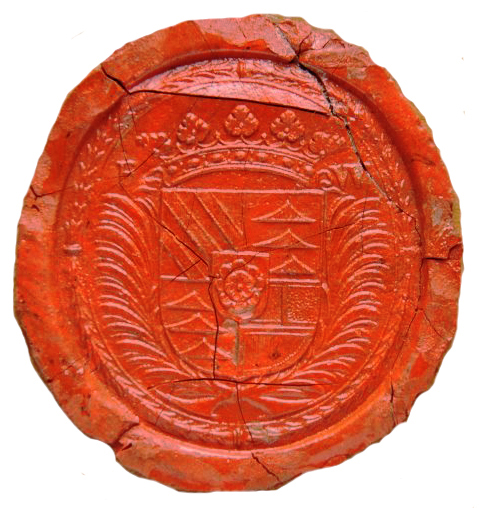
Seal of 1648

After law studies in Padua, Siena and Perugia from 1601 to 1603, Trauttmansdorff shortly became Rittmeister in the Imperial Army. He started his political career as member of the Aulic Council under Rudolf II in 1609. In 1614, he became Obersthofmeister of Empress Anna of Tyrol. Since the overthrow of the leading imperial counsellor Melchior Khlesl in 1618 and the coming into power of Ferdinand II, Trauttmansdorff was privy councillor and one of the most important diplomats of the new emperor.

In 1619, he arranged the alliance between Ferdinand II and Maximilian I, Elector of Bavaria. With Prince Gabriel Bethlen of Transylvania, he concluded the Peace of Nikolsburg in 1621. The emperor made him Reichsgraf in 1623 and elevated him into the Bohemian nobility in 1628. From 1633 on, Trauttmansdorff was Obersthofmeister and closest advisor to the emperor's son, Ferdinand III. In 1635, he arranged the Peace of Prague with the Electorate of Saxony.

With Ferdinand's coronation to emperor in 1637, Maximilian, now the Imperial Obersthofmeister, became the most powerful person of the imperial court behind the emperor.

He was the head of the delegation of the Holy Roman Empire for the Peace of Westphalia between 1645 and 1647 but was replaced by Johann Ludwig von Nassau-Hadamar in 1647 when his health deteriorated. In September 1648, he convinced Ferdinand to agree to the peace treaty without involvement of or military support for Spain, thus removing the last barrier on the way to peace.

== Marriage and issue ==
In 1615 he married Countess Maria Sophia Pálffy ab Erdöd (1596-1668), together they had the following surviving children:

- Count Adam Matthias von und zu Trauttmansdorff (1617-1687); married first to Countess Eva Johanna von Sternberg (d. 1674); married secondly to Maria Isabella Lobkowicz (1649-1719); no issue from both marriages
- Count Johann Friedrich von und zu Trauttmansdorff (1619-1696); married first to Princess Maria Clara von Dietrichstein (1626-1667); married secondly to Countess Maria Eleonora von Sternberg (1654-1703); had issue from both marriages
- Count Ferdinand von und zu Trauttmansdorff (d. 1692); married Countess Maria Elisabeth Kinsky von Wchinitz und Tettau (1670-1737); no issue
- Countess Maria Elisabeth von und zu Trauttmansdorff; Prioress
- Countess Maria Maximiliana von und zu Trauttmansdorff (d. 1692): married to Count Georg Siegmund von Herberstein (d. 1696)
- Count Franz Anton von und zu Trauttmansdorff (d. 1683): married Countess Margaretha von Porcia; had issue
- Count Maximilian von und zu Trauttmansdorff (d. 1705); married his relative Victoria Eleonora von Trauttmansdorff (d. 1705); no issue
- Count Karl von und zu Trauttmansdorff (d. 1664); Knight of the Order of St. John; no issue
- Count Georg Sigmund von und zu Trauttmansdorff (1638-1708); married Countess Eleonora Cäcilia Renata von Wildenstein (1643-1708); had issue

== Sources ==
- Egloffstein, Hermann von und zu (1894). "Trauttmansdorff, Maximilian Graf von". Allgemeine Deutsche Biographie (in German). Vol. 38. Leipzig: Duncker & Humblot. pp. 531–536.
- Kampmann, Christoph (2016). "Trauttmansdorff, Maximilian Graf von". Neue Deutsche Biographie (in German). Vol. 26. Berlin: Duncker & Humblot. pp. 376–378. (full text online).
