= Anna Aloysia Maximiliane von Lamberg =

Austrian countess (1676–1738)

- Countess Esterle
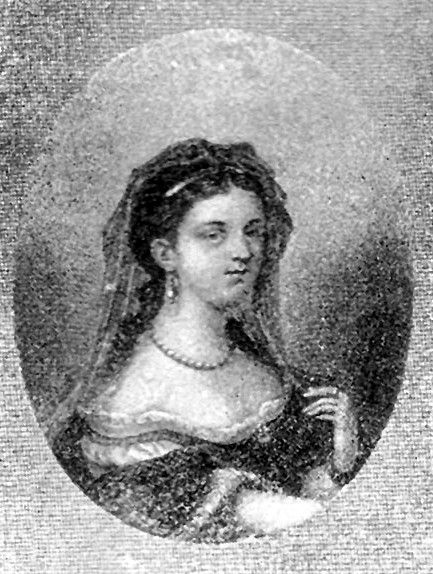
- Portrait of Countess Anna Aloysia Maximiliane von Lamberg (18th century)
- Known for: Mistress of Augustus II the Strong; Mistress of Aleksander Benedykt Sobieski
- Born: Anna Aloysia Maximiliane Louise von Lamberg; 1676
- Died: 28 June 1738 (aged 61–62); Wrocław, Kingdom of Poland
- Noble family: Lamberg
- Spouses: Count Franz Michael Hiserle von Chodau; Count Gustav Hannibal von Oppersdorff
- Father: Kaspar Friedrich Count von Lamberg-Kunstadt
- Mother: Countess Marie Franziska Theresia Hieserle von Chodau

Anna Aloysia Maximiliane Louise von Lamberg (1676 – 28 June 1738), also known as Countess Esterle, was an Austrian countess who was successively the mistress of Augustus II the Strong, King of Poland, and Aleksander Benedykt Sobieski.

== Early life ==
Born into the Austrian House of Lamberg, Anna Aloysia Maximiliane was the only daughter of Austrian nobleman Kaspar Friedrich Count von Lamberg-Kunstadt (1648-1686) by his first wife, Countess Marie Franziska Theresia Hieserle von Chodau (d. 1684), a Bohemian noblewoman.

== Court life ==
In 1695, she married firstly her cousin, Count Franz Michael Hiserle von Chodau (Czech: Hýzrle z Chodů) (1649–1709). She became the mistress of Augustus II the Strong in either 1696, with the affair lasting until 1699, or 1704.

Her first husband divorced her in 1697, and, in 1698, she married Count Gustav Hannibal von Oppersdorff (died 1744). On 1 November 1698, she gave birth to a son, Count von Oppersdorff, whose father was supposedly Augustus II. The child died soon after birth.

Her relationship with Augustus II ended when the "playboy king" discovered that Maximiliane had been having affairs with several gentlemen at the court; she was given a day to leave the country.

Later, in Wrocław, she became the mistress of Prince Aleksander Benedykt Sobieski, who had been Augustus's rival in the 1697 election for the Polish throne. She died on 28 June 1738 in Wrocław. Her second husband, Count Gustav Hannibal von Oppersdorff (Oppersdorf), died on 29 December 1744 in Kostelec nad Orlicí.
