= Johann Philipp von Harrach =

Johann Joseph Philipp Graf Harrach (Vienna, 22 October 1678 - Vienna, 8 August 1764) was an Imperial Field Marshal and from 1739 to 1762, President of the Hofkriegsrat (Imperial War Council).

== Biography ==
Johann Joseph Philipp Graf Harrach came from the old Bohemian noble family of Harrach. He was the youngest son of Ferdinand Bonaventura I von Harrach (1637 - 1706), an important Austrian diplomat during the reign of Emperor Leopold I and Imperial Ambassador in Spain. His elder brothers were Franz Anton, who became Bishop of Vienna and Archbishop of Salzburg, and Aloys Thomas, Viceroy of Naples.

=== Military career ===
Johann Philipp joined the Imperial Army and did his first military service in the War of the Spanish Succession. In the Battle of Cassano (16 August 1705) he took part as commander of an infantry regiment. As a Oberstlieutenant, he fought with distinction at the Battle of Calcinato (17 April 1706). During the retreat, he held the advancing French army with his Herberstein regiment and six grenadier companies at the bridge over the Chiese River, until his own defeated troops could be regrouped and brought back into action. When the enemy tried to bypass the position, he was able to thwart that plan.
After winning the Battle of Turin (7 September 1706), Prince Eugene sent him to Vienna with the news of his victory, because of his services during the campaign.

In 1708 Harrach was promoted to Lieutenant Fieldmarshal. He fought until the end of the war and the Treaty of Rastatt (1714), including in the battle at Mons, in the Dauphiné and in the Black Forest.

In 1716, he fought as Feldzeugmeister in the Battle of Peterwardein against the Turks, again under the supreme command of Prince Eugene. He also participated in the Siege of Temeşvar (1716) and the Siege of Belgrade (1717). In 1723 Harrach was promoted to Fieldmarshal.

=== Diplomatic career ===
in 1739 Emperor Charles VI appointed him President of the Imperial War Council, an office he held during 23 years, until 1762.
Johann Philipp Graf Harrach died on 8 August 1764 at the age of 85 in Vienna.
As he was also commander of the Austrian province of the Teutonic Order since 1733, a grave monument for him was erected in the Church of the Teutonic Order, Vienna.

== Sources ==
- Constantin von Wurzbach: "Harrach, Johann Joseph Philipp." In: Biographisches Lexikon des Kaiserthums Oesterreich (Biographical Lexicon of the Empire of Austria). Part 7 Kaiserlich-königliche Hof- und Staatsdruckerei, Vienna 1861, p. 381 (digitalised).
- Die Hofkriegsraths-Präsidenten und Kriegsminister der k. k. österreichischen Armee. Verlag des militär-wissenschaftlichen Vereins, Wien 1874.
- Bernhard von Poten (Hrsg.): Handwörterbuch der gesamten Militärwissenschaften. (Reprint d. Ausg. v. 1878, Verlag von Velhagen und Klasing, Bielefeld und Leipzig, Band 4), Archiv Verlag, Braunschweig o. J.
- Works by and about Johann Philipp von Harrach in the Deutsche Digitale Bibliothek (German Digital Library)
- Johann Philipp von Harrach in Austria-Forum (in German) (at AEIOU)
