= Lamberg =

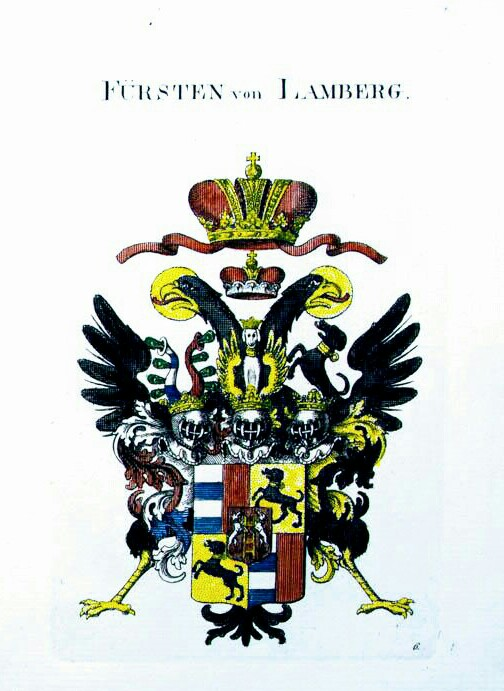
Princely arms of the House of Lamberg

The House of Lamberg is an ancient Austrian noble family, whose members occupied significant positions within the Holy Roman Empire and later in the Austro-Hungarian Empire.

== History ==
The family name first appeared during the 14th century in Carinthia. Members of the family were created Barons in the 16th century, Imperial Counts in the 17th century and later Princes of the Holy Roman Empire in the 18th century.

== Notable members of the family ==
- Anna Aloysia Maximiliane von Lamberg (1676-1738), Austrian countess, mistress of Augustus II the Strong
- Count Anton Franz de Paula von Lamberg-Sprinzenstein (1740–1822), an Austrian diplomat
- Count Franz Philipp von Lamberg (1791–1848), Austrian general
- Johann Maximilian von Lamberg (1608–1682), Obersthofmeister and a diplomat
- Johann Philipp von Lamberg (1651–1712), Bishop of Passau and a diplomat
- Johanna Theresia von Lamberg (1639–1716), lady-in-waiting to Mariana of Austria

== It may also refer to people not related to the noble House of Lamberg ==
- Adam Lamberg (born 1984), American actor
- Matti Lamberg (born 1993), Finnish ice hockey player
- Karin Lamberg-Skog (born 1961), Swedish skier
- Saara Lamberg (born 1986), Finnish actress

== See also ==
- Lambert (name)
- Lomberg
