= John Leopold, Prince of Trautson and Count of Falkenstein =

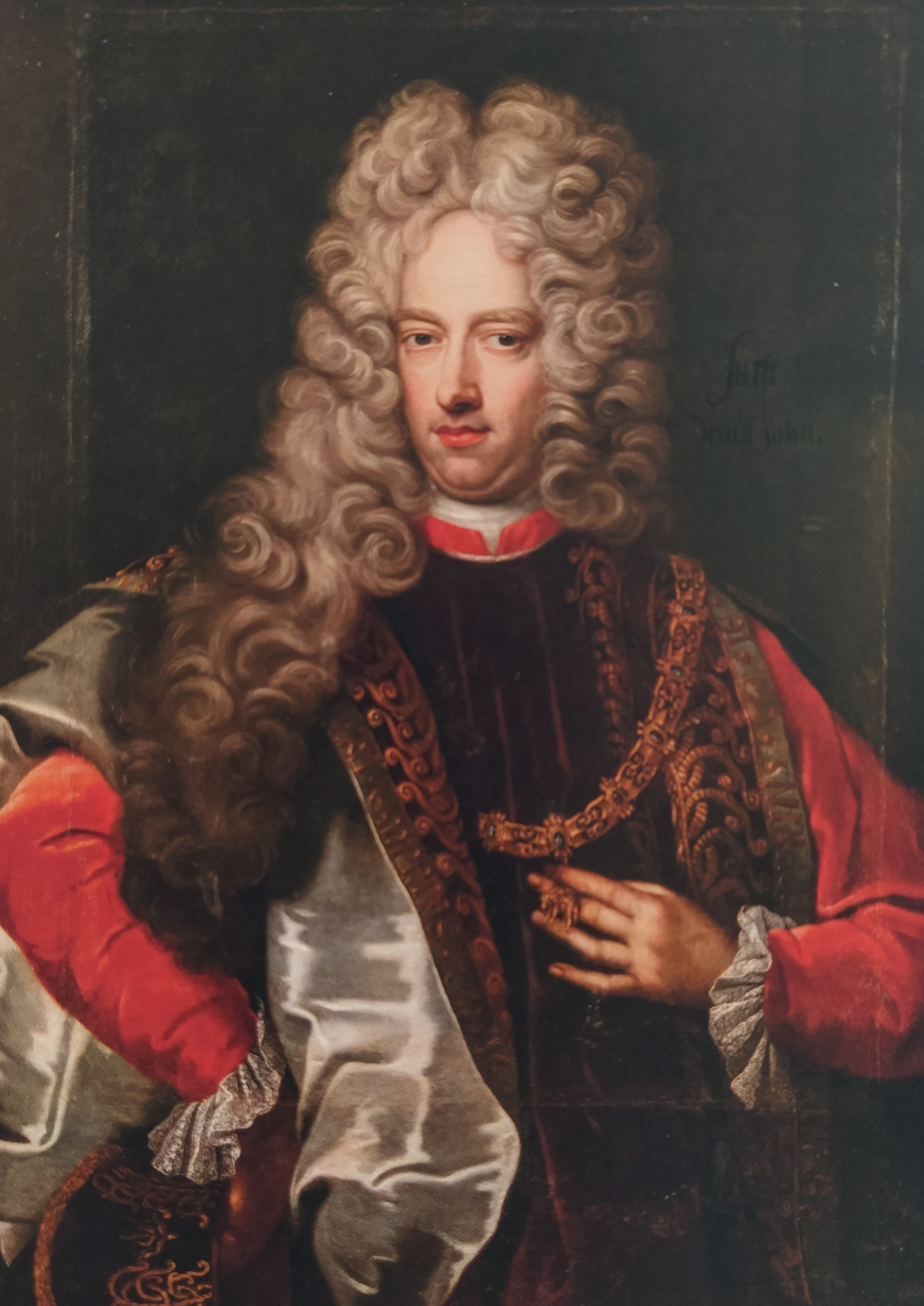
John Leopold, Prince of Trautson, Count of Falkenstein

John Leopold Donat of Trautson (German: Johann Leopold Donat von Trautson; 2 May 1659 in Vienna – 18 October 1724 in Sankt Pölten) was an Austrian nobleman and politician. Since 1711 he was the first Prince of Trautson, Imperial Count von Falkenstein and Baron zu Sprechenstein. He was educator, chamberlain and Obersthofmeister of Emperor Joseph I.

== Biography ==
John was the son of Johann Franz Trautson, Count of Falkenstein (1609–1663) and his wife, Maria Margareta von Rappach (1621–1705).

John Leopold became the tutor of the young future Emperor Joseph I. When Joseph ascended the throne in 1705, he made his confidant Johann Leopold Obersthofmeister and appointed him, together with Prince Eugene, to the Secret Conference, the most important government body.

In 1698, he became a Knight in the Order of the Golden Fleece. In 1711, a few weeks before his untimely death, the Emperor elevated him to the rank of Prince of the Holy Roman Empire. By 1712 he had the Palais Trautson built in Vienna, as a sign of his new dignity. in 1721, Emperor Charles VI appointed him a second time Obersthofmeister, after the death of Anton Florian, Prince of Liechtenstein, who had succeeded him in 1711.

== Marriage and children ==
He married in July 1694 with Maria Theresia Ungnad von Weißenwolff (1678–1741) and had:

- Johann Wilhelm (1700–1775), his successor; 1) Countess Maria Anna Josepha Ungnad von Weißenwolff (1703-1730); 2) married Countess Maria Franziska von Mansfeld (1707-1743); #) Baroness Maria Carolina Hager von Altensteig (1701–1793)
- Maria Christina (1702–1743), married Count Ottokar von Starhemberg (1681–1733);
- Johann Josef (1707–1757), Prince-Archbishop of Vienna;
- Maria Franziska Antonia (1708–1761), married Prince Heinrich Joseph Johann of Auersperg.
