= Burgruine Kühnburg =

Castle ruins in Austria

Burgruine Khünburg
- Carinthia, Austria
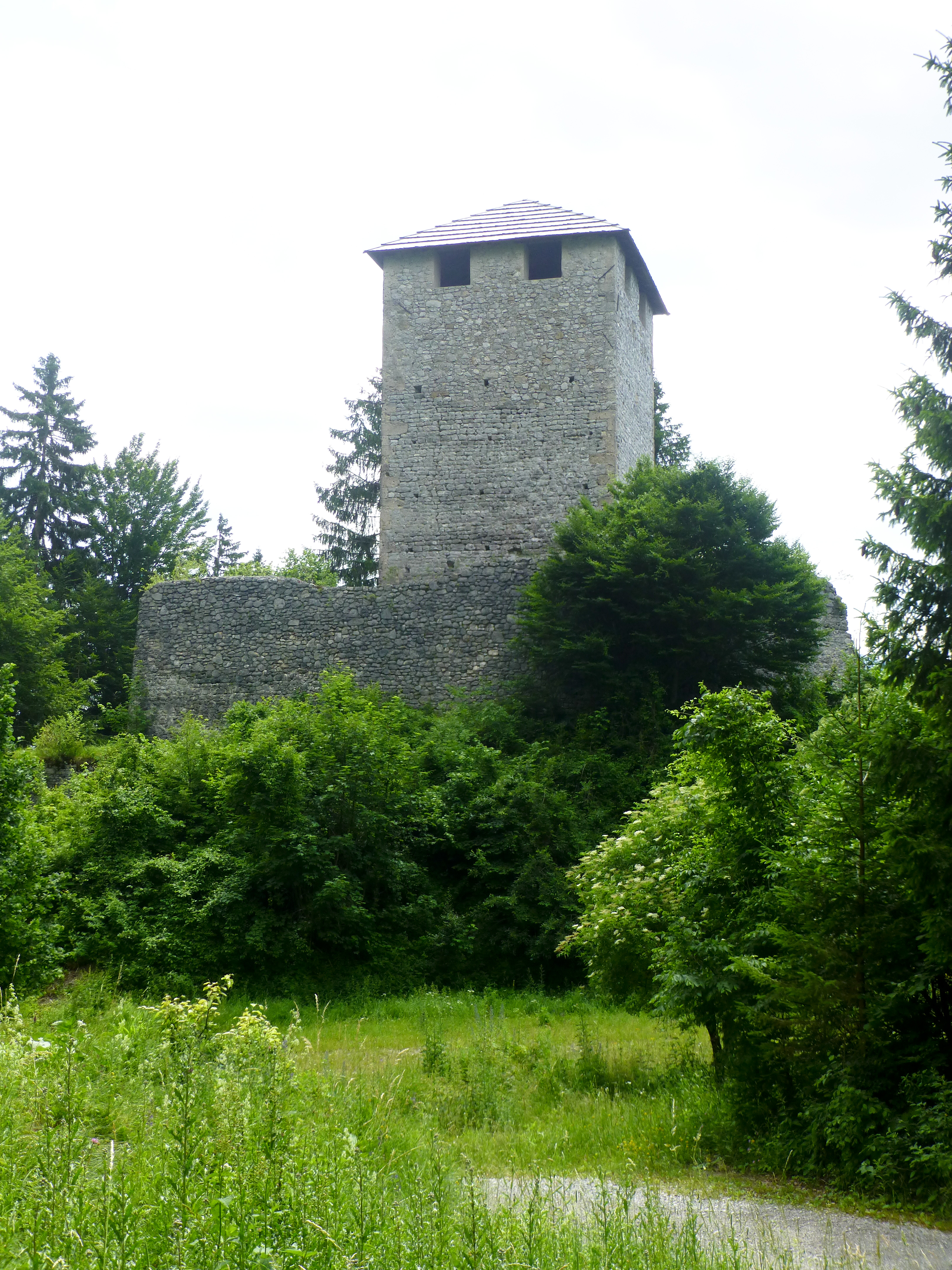

Site information
- Type: Castle

Location
- Coordinates: 46°38′13.5″N 13°25′12.4″E

Burgruine Khünburg is a castle in Carinthia, Austria.

== See also ==
- List of castles in Austria
