= Hofkriegsrat =

Central military administrative authority of the Habsburg monarchy

Coordinates: 48°12′38″N 16°22′06″E

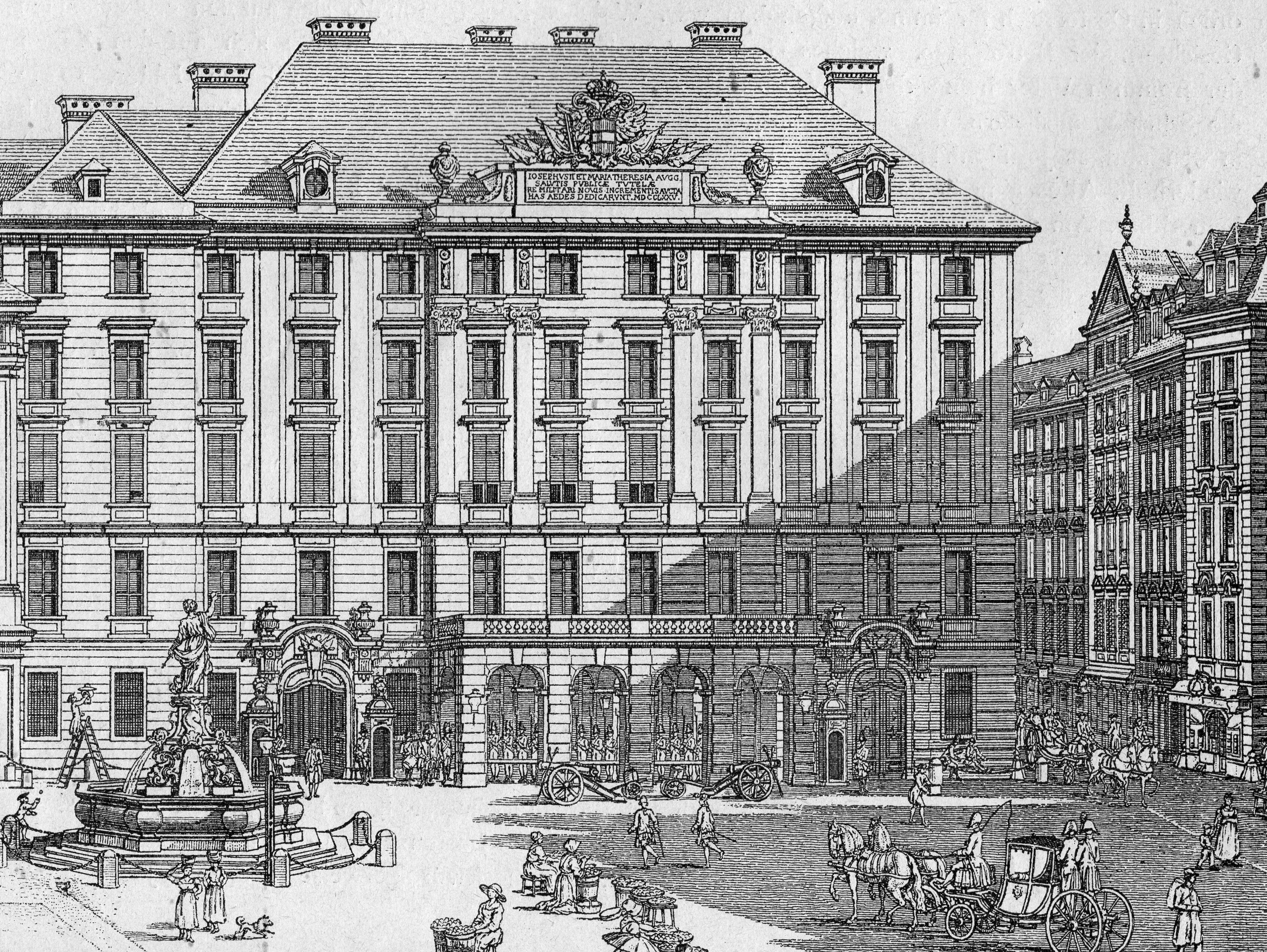
Hofkriegsrat building in Vienna, 1775

The Hofkriegsrat (or Aulic War Council, sometimes Imperial War Council) established in 1556 was the central military administrative authority of the Habsburg monarchy until 1848 and the predecessor of the Austro-Hungarian Ministry of War. The agency was directly subordinated to the Habsburg emperors with its seat in Vienna.

== History ==
Permanent councils of war had already been summoned by the Habsburg emperor Maximilian I about 1500. The council was initially called a regiment, and later a secret body, state government, court council or state council. In 1529 it was considered necessary to establish an independent war council but the negotiations remained unsuccessful for a long time. On February 25, 1531, Ferdinand I issued an instruction in Linz, which ordered the compilation of an independent war council consisting of four war councilors.

Founded on 17 November 1556 during the reign of Emperor Ferdinand I, the Steter Kriegsrat (Permanent War Council) was a council of five generals and senior civil servants. It oversaw the entire Habsburg military system in war and peace and decided on fortress construction, army equipment, salary issues and the purchase of supplies, as well as the planning and implementation of wars. It also handled civil and military administration of the border region of Croatia. On 31 December 1556, all military authorities were ordered to submit to the War Council. The title Hofkriegsrat was first used in 1564. The Hofkriegsrat submitted to the Imperial Chamber as a financial authority and to the Imperial Chancellery as a point of political coordination.

With the establishment of a standing Imperial Army in the 17th century, the Hofkriegsrat was the bureaucracy charged with managing the permanent military force. It served as the central military administrative agency and a military chancery, provided a staff for the emperor, and directed and coordinated field armies. Additionally, it conducted relations with the Ottoman Empire and administered the Military Frontier (Militärgrenze).

All generals had to apply for authorisation for any strategic decisions, except for the generalissimo, a rule that ensured coordinated action but proved disadvantageous facing an aggressive opponent like the Prussian king Frederick the Great. Emperor Joseph II further centralized the body and gave it supreme authority over all branches of the military administration. Field Marshal Alexander Suvorov became bogged down in Italy during his 1799 expedition due to the instructions of the Hofkriegsrat, which called for "trench" warfare instead of "lightning" warfare. When the reforming Archduke Charles was appointed president of the Hofkriegsrat by Emperor Francis II in 1801, he divided the agency into three departments, dealing with military, judicial, and administrative matters.

Following the Napoleonic Wars, the Hofkriegsrat, as one of four components of the governing State Council (Staatsrat), continued to exert control over the military to the will of the Emperor of Austria. Its bureaucracy was cumbersome and decisions were often arrived at only after much argument and circulation of papers. While the presidents were always officers, section heads were frequently civilians and there was often tension between them. The military men resented interference by what Radetzky would later call a civilian "despotism". An additional problem was presented in the fact that in a time when the general staff was growing in importance in other countries (notably Prussia), in Austria it remained only a subordinate section of the Hofkriegsrat.

Amidst the growing nationalist troubles leading up to the 1848 Revolutions, the Hofkriegsrat investigated the reliability of units with suspect loyalties. In 1833 it ruled that all soldiers in the imperial army belonging to Mazzini's Italian nationalist Young Italy movement were guilty of high treason and were to be court-martialed. In the 1840s it investigated even the traditionally loyal South Slav Grenzer but determined that they would likely act as ordered, especially if in action against the Hungarians.

With effect from 1 June 1848 the Hofkriegsrat was turned into the Austrian Ministry of War. According to the Austro-Hungarian Compromise of 1867, it became one of the three common ministries of the dual monarchy.

== Presidents ==
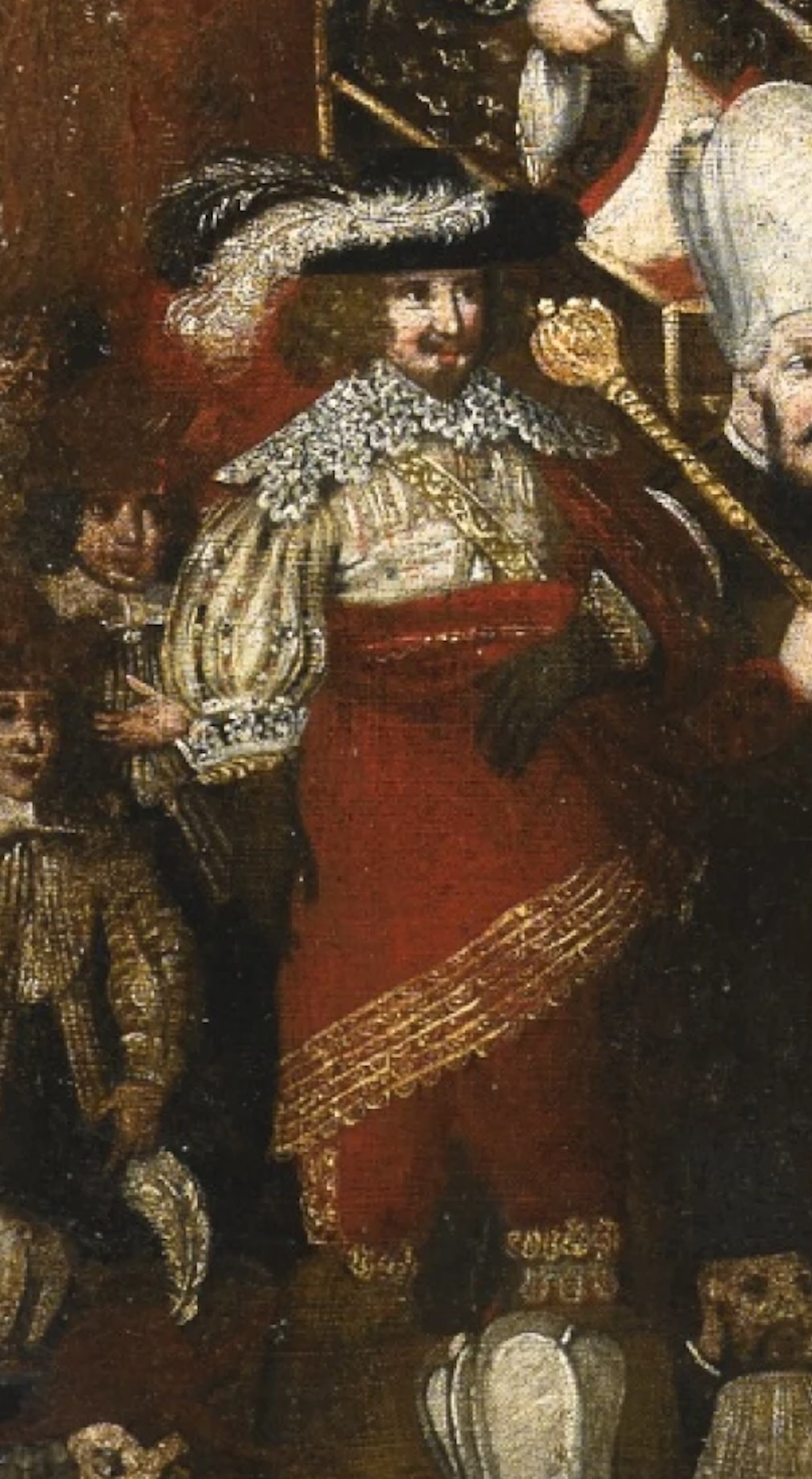
Hans Freiherr von Mollard, President of the Hofkriegsrat from 1610 to 1619, as Austrian ambassador to the Porte in 1618, Istanbul

1. Ritter Ehrenreich von Königsberg 1556–1560
2. Gebhard Freiherr von Welzer 1560–1566
3. Georg Teufel, Freiherr von Guntersdorf 1566–1578
4. Wilhelm Freiherr von Hofkirchen 1578–1584
5. David Ungnad, Freiherr von Weißenwolf 1584–1599
6. Melchior Freiherr von Redern 1599–1600
7. Count Karl Ludwig Sulz 1600–1610
8. Hans Freiherr von Mollard 1610–1619
9. Johann Kaspar von Stadion 1619–1624
10. Ramboldo, Count of Collalto 1624–1630
11. Hans Christoph Freiherr von Löbel 1630–1632
12. Count Heinrich Schlick 1632-1649
13. Wenzel Fürst Lobkowitz, Duke of Sagan 1649–1665
14. Annibale (Hannibal), Prince Gonzaga 1665–1668
15. Raimondo Montecuccoli 1668–1681
16. Hermann of Baden-Baden 1681–1691
17. Ernst Rüdiger von Starhemberg 1692–1701
18. Heinrich Franz von Mansfeld, Prince of Fondi 1701–1703
19. Prince Eugene of Savoy 1703–1736
20. Dominik von Königsegg-Rothenfels 1736–1738
21. Johann Philipp von Harrach 1738–1761
22. Count Leopold Joseph von Daun 1762–1766
23. Count Franz Moritz von Lacy 1766–1774
24. Count Andreas Hadik von Futak 1774–1790
25. Count Michael Johann Wallis 1791–1796
26. Friedrich Moritz, Count Nostitz-Rieneck 1796
27. Count Ferdinand Tige 1796–1801
28. Archduke Charles, Duke of Teschen 1801–1809
29. Count Heinrich von Bellegarde 1809–1813
30. Karl Philipp, Prince of Schwarzenberg 1814–1820
31. Count Heinrich von Bellegarde 1820–1825
32. Friedrich Franz Xaver Prince of Hohenzollern-Hechingen 1825–1830
33. Count Ignaz Gyulai 1830–1831
34. Count Johann Maria Philipp Frimont 1831
35. Ignaz Count Hardegg 1831–1848
36. Count Karl Ludwig von Ficquelmont 1848

== In fiction ==
In Tolstoy's War and Peace, a retired Russian officer, Prince Nikolai Andreevich Bolkonski, calls it the Hof-kriegs-wurst-schnapps-rat, mocking it by adding the well-known German words Wurst (sausage) and Schnapps (booze).

". . .and that's for all the world like the old Austrian Hofkriegsrath, as far as I can judge of military matters, that is. On paper, they'd beaten Napoleon and taken him prisoner and there in their study they worked it all out in the cleverest fashion. But look you, General Mack surrendered with all his army -- he-he-he. . ."—Porfiry Petrovitch (Crime and Punishment, Dostoevsky)

== See also ==
- Cabinet wars

== Bibliography ==
- Rothenberg, Gunther E. (1976). The army of Francis Joseph. West Lafayette, Indiana: Purdue University Press. ISBN 978-0911198416. LCCN 75016051.
