= Obersthofmeister =

Official in the Holy Roman and Austrian imperial courts

Oberhofmeister of the Austrian King and Emperor (Grand Master of the Court) was the most important function at the court of the Holy Roman Emperor (until 1806) and the Emperor of Austria in Vienna (1804–1918). The Oberhofmeister acted as the direct head of the imperial court and household and was as such very influential.

== Position ==
As can be seen in the annual Hof- und Staats Handbuch, the monarch's Obersthofmeister ranked directly behind the royal family and above all other high nobility. The Obersthofmeister of the monarch had his seat in the Hofburg in Vienna.

The tasks of His Majesty's Obersthofmeister's Office in Vienna included the administration of the castles and palaces used by the court, including construction work, the supervision of the k.k. Court theater (Hofburgtheater and Hofoper in Vienna), and especially the politically relevant planning of the ceremonial (e.g. speech and table arrangements, order of priority of the carriages) for formal appearances by the monarch and the preparation of invitations to the audience of the ruler. This position only ended upon the death of the monarch or the Oberhofmeister himself.

When the unified Austrian Empire was reorganized into the dual monarchy of Austria-Hungary in 1867, a second Oberhofmeister was installed at the royal court in Budapest. An example of a very influential Oberhofmeister is Alfred, 2nd Prince of Montenuovo (1908–1917), who had a strong influence over his cousin, the aging Franz Joseph I.

=== Other use of the name Oberhofmeister ===
The monarch's wife, had her own court with an Oberhofmeisterin (or senior lady-in-waiting). The crown prince and other long-standing archdukes were also entitled to employees with the title of Oberhofmeister. This title also appeared at other princely courts and also at smaller dynasties in Germany. The office of Obersthofmeister gradually gained everywhere the importance of a state office, comparable to a cabinet minister.

== List of the Obersthofmeisters of the Austrian king and emperor in Vienna ==
- 1619–1625 Prince Hans Ulrich von Eggenberg
- 1625–1626 Gundaker, Prince of Liechtenstein
- 1626–1637 Leonard Helfrid, Count of Meggau
- 1637–1650 Count Maximilian von und zu Trauttmansdorff-Weinsberg
- 1650–1655 Prince Maximilian of Dietrichstein
- 1655–1657 Johann Weikhard of Auersperg
- 1657–1665 John Ferdinand, Count of Porcia
- 1665–1674 Wenzel Eusebius, Prince of Lobkowicz
- 1675–1682 Count Johann Maximilian von Lamberg
- 1683-1683 Albert, Count of Zinzendorf and Pottendorf
- 1683–1698 Ferdinand Joseph, Prince of Dietrichstein
- 1699–1705 Ferdinand Bonaventura von Harrach
- 1705–1709 Charles Theodore, Prince of Salm
- 1709–1711 Prince Johann Leopold von Trautson, Count von Falkenstein
- 1711–1721 Anton Florian, Prince of Liechtenstein
- 1721–1724 Prince Johann Leopold von Trautson, Graf von Falkenstein
- 1724–1747 Sigmund Rudolph, Count of Sinzendorf and Thannhausen
- 1747–1751 Count Dominik von Königsegg-Rothenfels
- 1753–1769 Count Anton Corfiz von Ulfeldt
- 1769–1776 Prince Johann Joseph of Khevenhüller
- 1776–1782 Prince Joseph I Adam of Schwarzenberg
- 1783–1807 Prince Johann Georg Adam I von Starhemberg
- 1807–1827 Prince Ferdinand von und zu Trauttmansdorff-Weinsberg
- 1827–1835 vacant
- 1835–1843 Rudolf, Prince of Colloredo-Mannsfeld
- 1844–1848 vacant
- 1848–1849 Count Karl Ludwig von Grünne
- 1849–1865 Prince Karl of Liechtenstein
- 1866–1896 Prince Konstantin of Hohenlohe-Waldenburg-Schillingsfürst
- 1896–1908 Prince Rudolf of Liechtenstein
- 1909–1917 Prince Alfred von Montenuovo
- 1917–1918 Prince Konrad of Hohenlohe-Schillingsfürst
- 1918-1918 Count Leopold Berchtold von und zu Ungarschitz

== See also ==
- Hofmeister (office)

== Sources ==
- Habsburger.net
- German Wikipedia
