= Johann Philipp von Lamberg =

His Eminence Johann Philipp von Lamberg
- Prince-Bishop of Passau
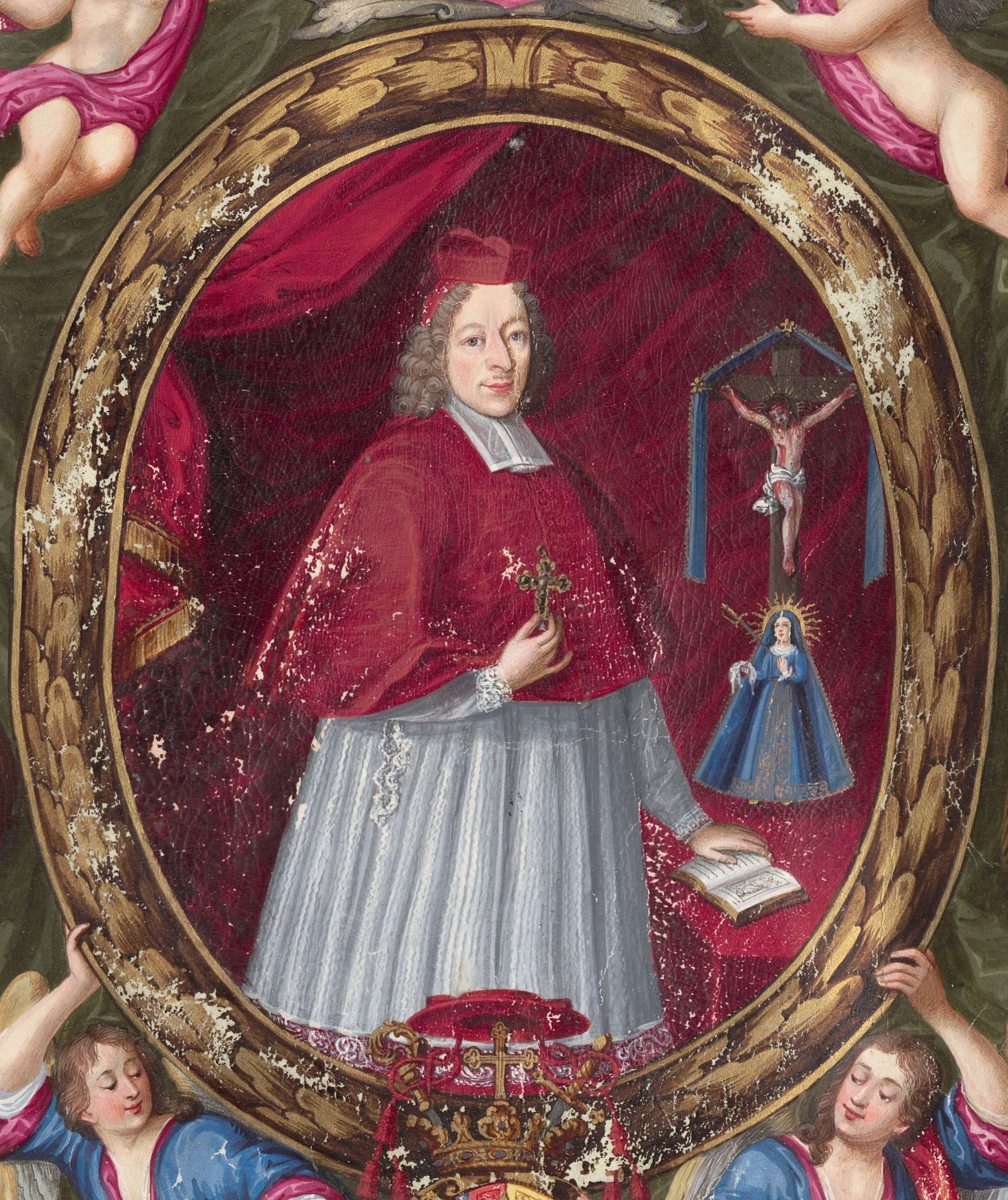
- Potrait of Cardinal Lamberg, 18th century
- Church: Catholic Church
- Diocese: Passau
- Appointed: 25 May 1689
- Term ended: 30 October 1712
- Predecessor: Sebastian von Pötting
- Successor: Raymund Ferdinand
- Other posts: Cardinal-Priest of San Silvestro in Capite (1701-1712)

Orders
- Ordination: 11 January 1690
- Consecration: 14 May 1690 by Leopold Karl von Kollonitsch
- Created cardinal: 21 June 1700 by Pope Innocent XII
- Rank: Cardinal-Priest

Personal details
- Born: 25 May 1651 Vienna, Austria
- Died: 30 October 1712 (aged 51) Regensburg, Germany
- Buried: St. Stephen's Cathedral
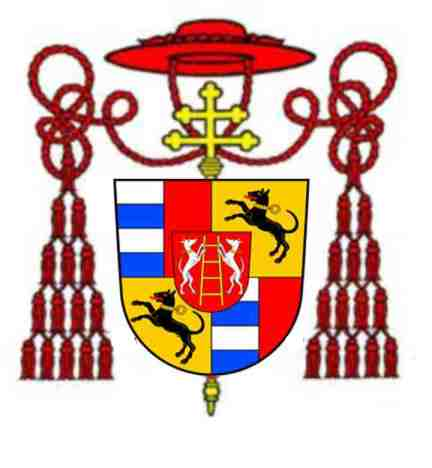
- Coat of arms

Johann Philipp Cardinal Count von Lamberg (25 May 1651 in Vienna - 30 October 1712 in Regensburg), was bishop of Passau, a Cardinal, bishop, and diplomat in the service of the Habsburg emperors.

== Early life ==
Johann Philipp von Lamberg was born in Vienna on 25 May 1652 (or 1651) and was baptized the following day. He was the uncle of Cardinal Joseph Dominicus von Lamberg (1680–1761).

Originating from the old Austrian aristocracy, born into the House of Lamberg, he was son of Count Johann Maximilian von Lamberg-Steyr (1608-1682) (reputable diplomat who was a member of the delegation of the Holy Roman Empire when negotiating the Westphalian Peace) and his wife Countess Judith Rebecca Eleonore von Wrbna und Freudenthal (1612-1690).

== Biography ==
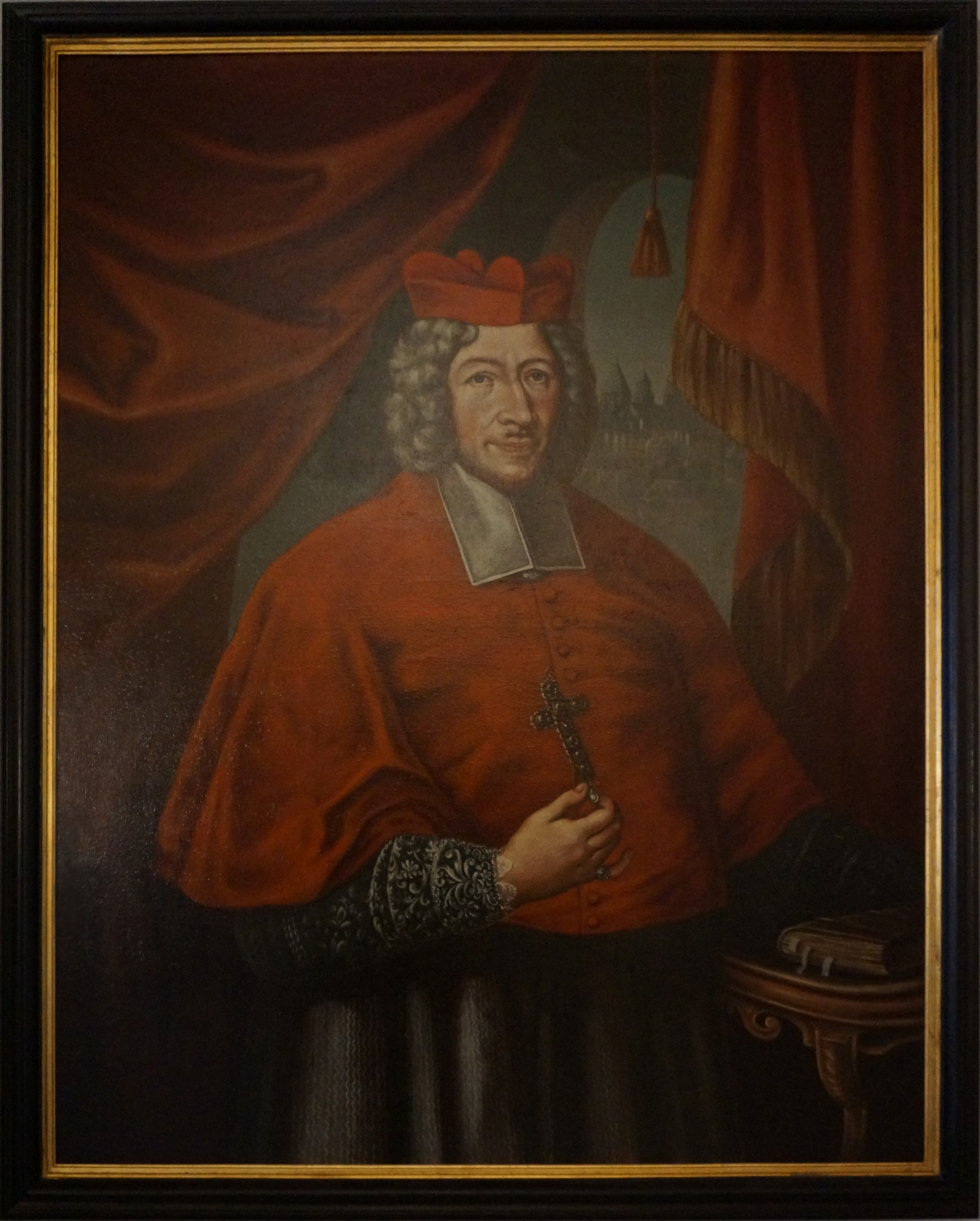
Johann Philipp von Lamberg

Having completed his studies in Vienna and Passau, he went to study in Siena where he obtained his doctorate in utroque iure (canon law and civil law) on 14 August 1673.

In 1663, he became a canon in Passau, in 1668 in Olomouc, and in 1673 Doctor iuris utriusque at the University of Siena. In 1675, he was succeeded by his appointment as mayor in Salzburg and in 1676 as imperial court councilor. As such, he was ambassador in Düsseldorf, Dresden, Berlin and Regensburg. Lamberg also participated in the Great Turkish War.

Elected bishop of Passau from his own chapter on 25 May 1689, he was granted access to the office despite not yet having received the diaconate with a papal dispensation of 11 January 1690. On 14 May 1690, the bishop's ordination was performed by the Archbishop of Kalocsa, Leopold Karl von Kollonitsch. At the same time, for his consecration as bishop, he was guaranteed the dispensation to be appointed to the episcopal see by a bishop and two abbots working together since on 14 January 1690, there were no bishops in the area who were not involved in other religious or territorial issues. Appointed royal commissioner in Regensburg, he was imperial plenipotentiary minister to the Diet of Regensburg.

Johann Philipp von Lamberg also remained as a prince-bishop mainly a politician and diplomat. In 1697, he went as an imperial emissary to Warsaw, where he helped to arrange the election of Elector Frederick Augustus of Saxony as the king of Poland–Lithuania. In 1699, he was appointed Imperial Principal Commissar, and on 21 July 1700, at the suggestion of Emperor Leopold I, his appointment as Cardinal priest was followed by Pope Innocent XII. His titular church was San Silvestro in Capite. He took part in conclave 1700, in which Clement XI was elected as Pope.

In his court of Passau, he had as Kapellmeister Georg Muffat and Benedikt Anton Aufschnaiter.

At the outbreak of the War of the Spanish Succession in 1702, he succeeded in the Perpetual Diet of Regensburg by declaring a Reichskrieg against France and the Reichsacht (imperial ban) against Maximilian II Emanuel, Elector of Bavaria and his brother, Archbishop-Elector Joseph Clemens of Cologne. Also during the elections of emperors Joseph I and Charles VI was diplomatically active.

He died on 21 October 1712 in the abbey of St Emmeram in Regensburg. His corpse, transported to Passau, was publicly displayed in the city cathedral and then buried in the chapel that he had himself erected in the cathedral cloister.

== Legacy ==
Under his aegis the completion of the Cathedral of St. Stephen was completed in Passau and the construction of the New Residence Palace (Neue Residenz) began. He moved the clerical seminar from the Passau Jesuit College in 1694 to the building of today's state library. Finally, at the cathedral crossroads he built his own burial site, now named the Lamberg Chapel (Lamberg-Kapelle).

Some traces of his activities also can be found outside of Passau: in the trade routes belonging to the so-called Goldener Steig ("Golden Trail"), he founded several new villages, of which Philippsreut still bears its name.
