= Lomberg =

Lomberg is a Germanic surname. Notable people with the surname include:

- Bjørn Lomborg (born 1965), Danish author and environmentalist
- Charles Lomberg (1886–1966), Swedish decathlete
- Jon Lomberg (born 1948), American space artist and science journalist
- Ryan Lomberg (born 1994), Canadian ice hockey player
