= Palais Trautson =

Coordinates: 48°12′21″N 16°21′19″E

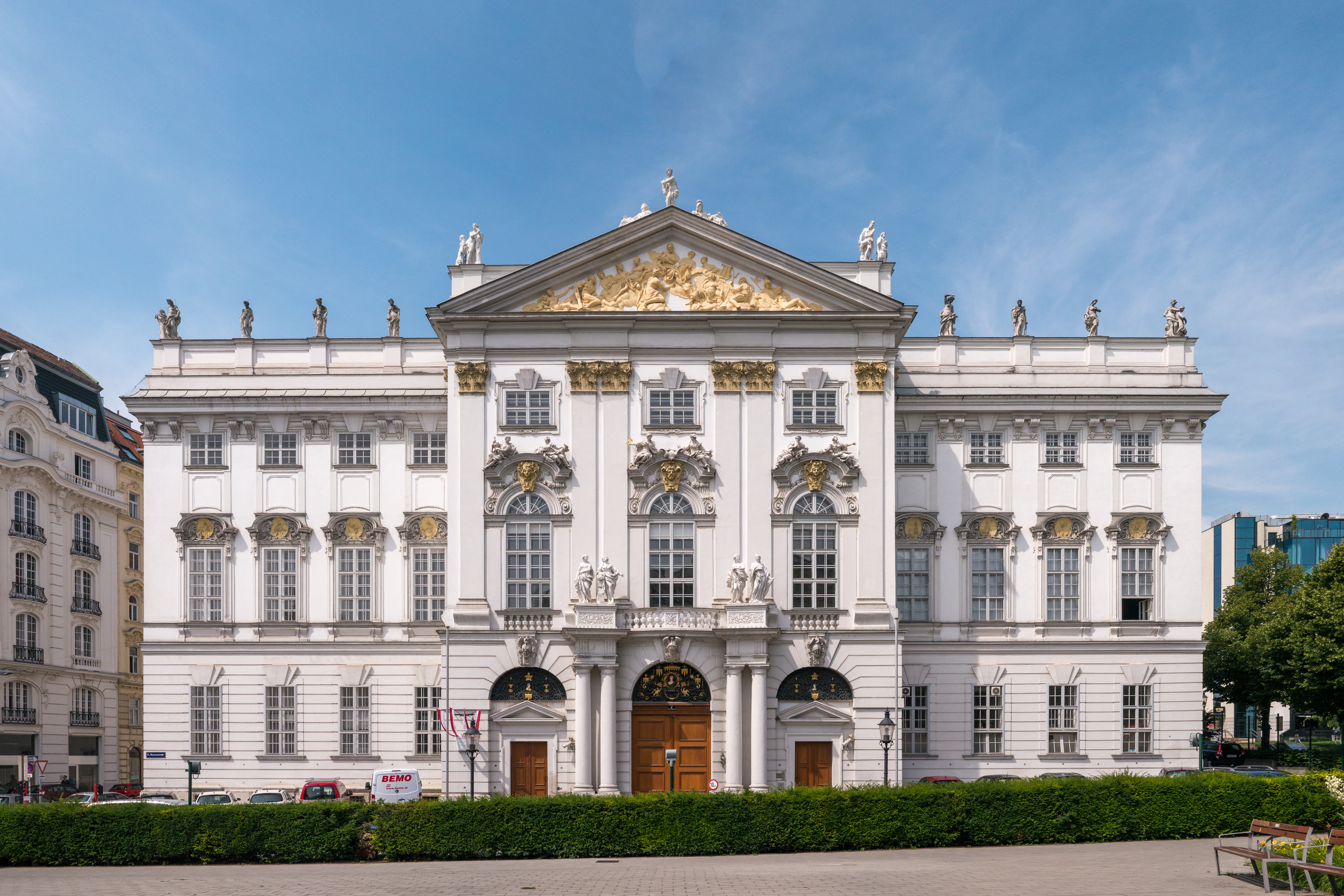
Palais Trautson in 2015

Palais Trautson is a Baroque palace in Vienna, Austria, located at Museumstraße 7. It was once owned by the noble Trautson family.

== History ==
The land on which the palace is built originally belonged to Countess Maria Margareta Trautson in 1657 and consisted of a small house and a vineyard. After the Battle of Vienna, During repairs Johann Leopold Donat von Trautson, the prince of Troutson, commissioned Christian Alexander Oedtl to build the palace in 1712. Oedtl used designs by Johann Bernhard Fischer von Erlach. In 1760, the palace was bought by Empress Maria Theresa of Austria for 40,000 Guilders, who then gave the palace to the Hungarian Guard. The Hungarian Guard converted the palace's garden to a riding school and the orangery to the stables. Since 1920, the Hungarian Historical Institute in Vienna, and since 1924 the Collegium Hungaricum were headquartered in the palace. In 1961, the Hungarian government sold the palace.
