= Aloys Thomas Raimund, Count Harrach =

Austrian politician and diplomat (1699–1742)

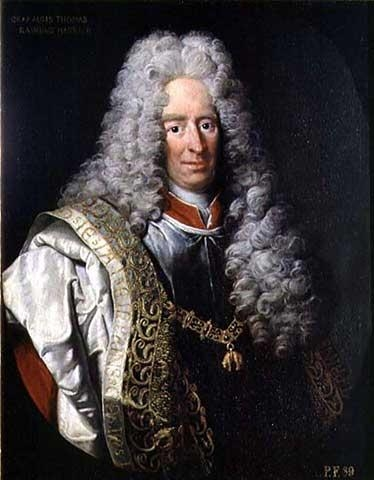
Count Aloys Thomas Raimund von Harrach zu Rohrau by Johann Gottfried Auerbach, (18th century)

Aloys Thomas Raimund, Count von Harrach zu Rohrau (7 March 1669, Vienna – 7 November, 1742, Vienna) was an Austrian nobleman, politician and a diplomat.

== Early life and ancestry ==
Born into one of the most prestigious Austrian noble families, the House of Harrach, Aloys Thomas was the fourth son of Count Ferdinand Bonaventura I von Harrach and his wife, Countess Johanna Theresia von Lamberg, daughter of Count Johann Maximilian von Lamberg, Austrian diplomat and courtier.

== Biography ==
Aloys von Harrach was the envoy of Leopold I, the Austrian Emperor in Dresden in 1694, served in the same function in Spain from 1697 to 1700 and was in Dresden again in 1711, and thereafter in Berlin and Hanover on diplomatic missions. From 1715 to 1742 he acted as 'Landmarschall' in Lower Austria, and from 1728 to 1733 as Viceroy of Naples, from where he gathered numerous art pieces (Gallery in Rohrau). From 1734 to his death Count Harrach was a member of the Secret State Conference (Geheime Staatskonferenz) in Vienna.

His oldest son, Count Friedrich August von Harrach-Rohrau, was interim governor of the Austrian Netherlands, and his youngest son, Ferdinand Bonaventura II von Harrach, governor of the Duchy of Milan. Another son, Wenzel Leopold, was killed in the Battle of San Pietro in 1734.

Joseph Haydn's mother, Maria née Koler, once served as a cook in his palace.

== Private life ==
The Count was married three times:

- His firstly married on 22 April 1691 to Countess Marie Barbara von Sternberg, daughter of Count Wenzel Adalbert von Sternberg (1638-1708) and his wife, Clara Bernhardine von Maltzan (1645-1719). They had issue.
- He married secondly on 22 August 1695 to Countess Anna Caecilie von Thannhausen, widow of Count Michael Oswald von Thun und Hohenstein (1631-1694), daughter of Count Johann Joseph Ignaz von Thannhausen (1650-1684) and his wife, Anna Eleonore Truchsess von Wetzhausen (1657-1692). They had issue.
- He married for the third time on 7 June 1721, to Countess Ernestine von Dietrichstein (1683–1744), widow of Count Johann Wenzel von Gallas, daughter of Count Philipp Sigmund of Dietrichstein and his first wife, Baroness Marie Elisabeth Hofmann von Grünbühel und Strechau (1663-1705). They didn't have children.
