= Benedict Anton Aufschnaiter =

Austrian Baroque composer

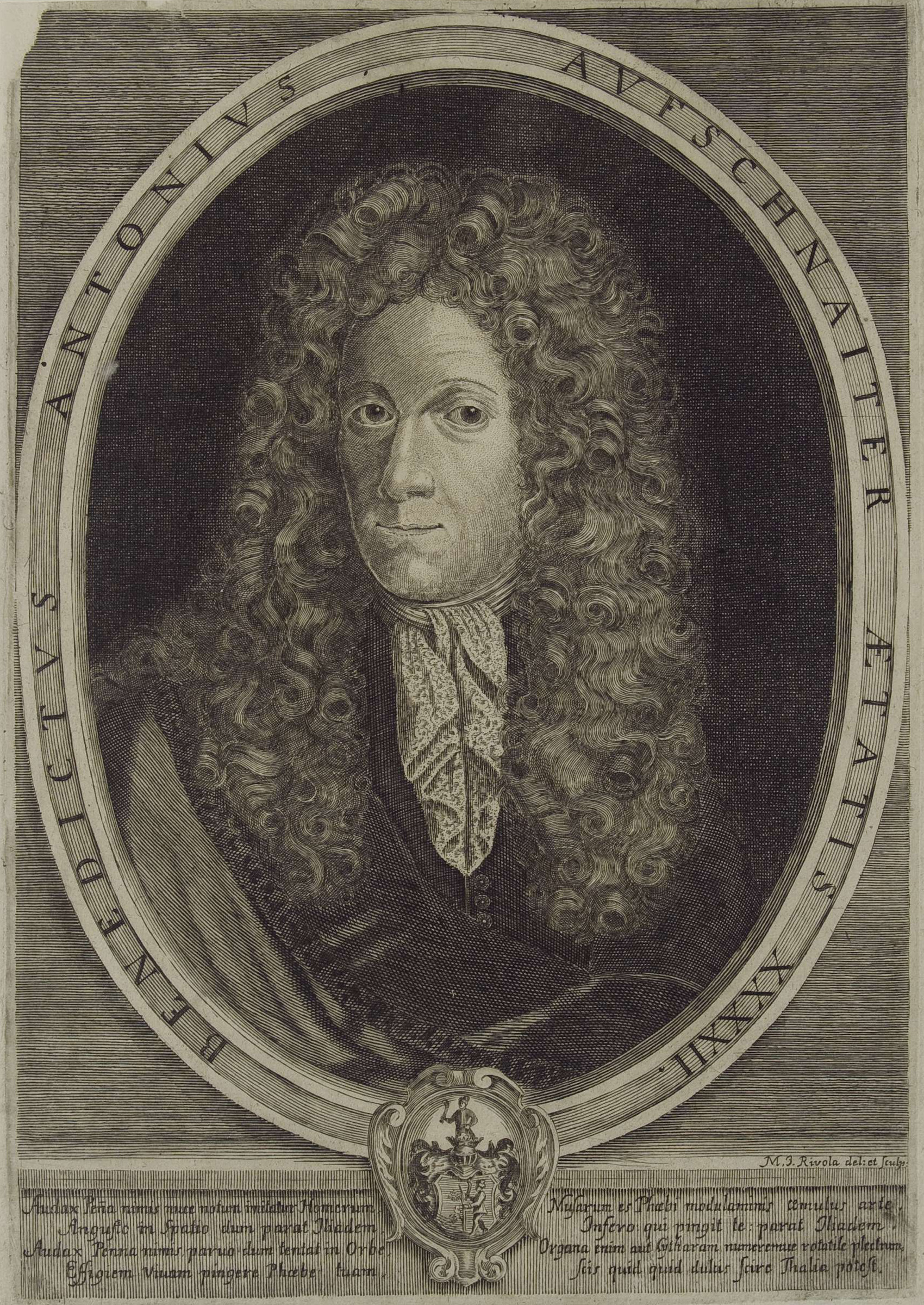
Benedikt Anton Aufschnaiter

Benedict Anton Aufschnaiter (baptised 21 February 1665, Kitzbühel, County of Tyrol – buried 24 January 1742, Passau) was an Austrian Baroque composer.

== Life and career ==
Aufschnaiter received much of his musical education in Vienna, where he lived for several years. Later he got a post at the band near to the emperor's court. On 16 January 1705, he was appointed Kapellmeister at the Passau court by Bishop-Cardinal Johann Philipp von Lamberg as a successor to Georg Muffat. Aufschnaiter died there in January 1742.

He was married twice and from the second marriage, he had a son.

Most of Aufschnaiter's 300 surviving works are sacred. In his Regulæ Fundamentales Musurgiæ, he named Giacomo Carissimi, Orlande de Lassus, Johann Kaspar Kerll and Adam Gumpelzhaimer as his idols.

== List of selected works ==
=== Theoretical works ===
- Regulæ Fundamentales Musurgiæ (Fundamental rules on composing good music)

=== Compositions ===
- Concors discordia op. 2 (Nürnberg 1695) – six serenades for orchestra
- Dulcis Fidium Harmoniæ op. 4 (Augsburg 1703) – eight string sonatas
- Memnon sacer ab oriente op. 5 (Augsburg 1709) – Vesper psalms
- Alaudæ V op. 6 (1711) – five masses
- Aquila clangens op. 7 (Passau 1719) – twelve offertories
- Cymbalum Davidis op. 8 (Passau 1728) – four Vesper psalms
- Miserere pro tempore quadragesimae op. 9 (unpublished, 1724)
- Concerto o parthia della cortesia
- Kommt, beschaut die Weisoheit – Pastorella-Trio sonata
- Litaniae Lauretanae
- Requiem in C major (1738)
- Serenada della pace in C major
- Sonata gloriosa
