= Johann Maximilian von Lamberg =

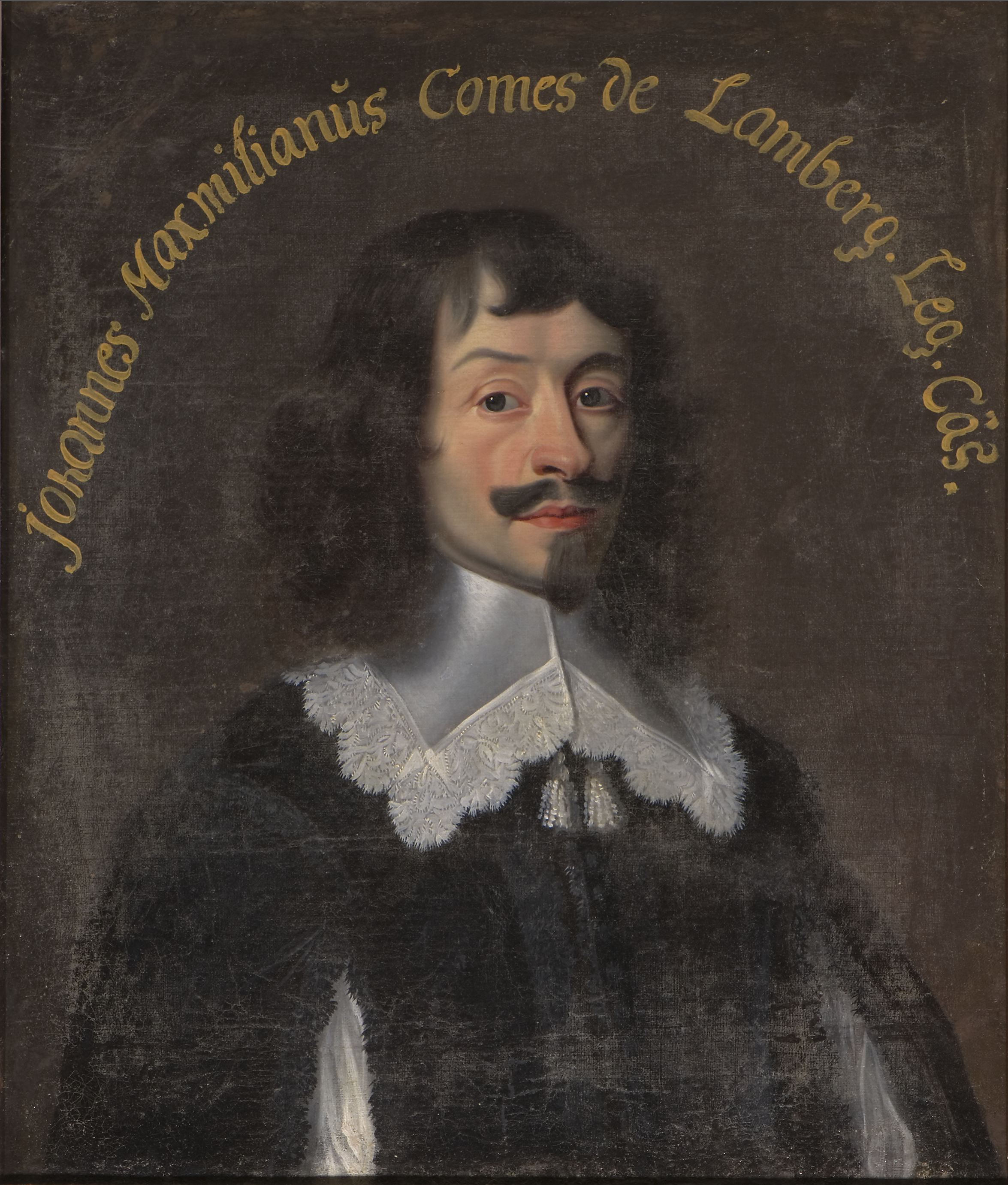
Johann Maximilian von Lamberg, 1608-1682

Johann Maximilian von Lamberg (German: Johann Maximilian Nepomuk Reichsgraf von Lamberg-Steyr, Brno, 23 November 1608 – Vienna, 12 December 1682) was an Austrian nobleman, diplomat and courtier. In the service of the Habsburgs, he excelled in the peace negotiations at the end of the Thirty Years' War, resulting in the Peace of Westphalia. Later in high offices he was one of the influential figures of the imperial court. In addition to gaining the title of count (1641), he expanded the family property in various parts of the Empire.

== Biography ==
=== Youth and the Peace of Westphalia ===
He came from the ancient Lamberg family, dating from the 14th century. Johann Maximilian's father Georg Siegmund von Lamberg (1565–1632) was Empress Anna's Obersthofmeister and had a total of fourteen children from three marriages. His third wife and mother of Johann Maximilian was Giovanna della Scala (Johanna von der Leiter, 1574–1649), widow of Sigismund of Dietrichstein. He was therefore the half-brother of Maximilian, Prince of Dietrichstein, and this close connection with a leading noble family helped the Lambergs to build a prestigious position at court in the 17th century.

Johann Maximilian studied law in Vienna and undertook a cavalier tour of Europe, visiting Italy, France and Spain, acquiring knowledge of several languages during his studies and travels. After returning to Vienna, he was appointed Imperial Chamberlain, and as a soldier he took part in several battles of the Thirty Years' War, including the Battle of Nördlingen (1634). Already as an imperial court councilor, he participated in the coronation of Ferdinand III in 1636 and on that occasion he was elevated to the rank of Count.

As a member of the Imperial Court Council, Lamberg devoted himself to foreign policy. From 1644 he was one of the Imperial envoys in Osnabrück, where peace negotiations to end the Thirty Years' War began. While Sweden was then trying to reverse the outcome of the war by invading Moravia and later Prague, Lamberg completed a series of difficult negotiations with Swedish Chancellor Axel Oxenstierna. Lamberg was the co-author and signatory of the final peace treaty known as the Peace of Westphalia.

=== Career at court ===
After returning to Vienna, he became the highest chamberlain of Archduke Leopold in 1650, and the following year he was appointed Oberhofmeister to the future Empress, Eleonora Gonzaga von Mantua-Nevers, the third wife of Emperor Ferdinand III. He was sent to Mantua, where he represented the Emperor during the marriage by proxy on 2 March 1651 and then accompanied Eleonora Gonzaga with her entourage to her marriage in Vienna on 2 April.
In 1655 he was appointed a Knight of the Order of the Golden Fleece. In 1657, he was sent to Madrid, where for 7 years he defended as Ambassador the interests of the Austrian Habsburgs. As a favorite of the imperial court, he received ample financial resources for his representation.

In 1662, he obtained for his family the hereditary post of the Erb-Stallmeister in Carniola, and similarly in 1675 he received the hereditary office of the highest chamberlain in Upper Austria. In the years 1661–1675, he was the highest chamberlain of Emperor Leopold I, and after the forced departure of Prince Wenzel Eusebius, Prince of Lobkowicz, he completed his career as the Emperor's Obersthofmeister and member of the secret state conference (1675–1682).

He is described in the literature as an honest and educated nobleman who was not inclined to scheming and, thanks to the long-term trust of Emperor Leopold I, he was one of the important figures of the Habsburg monarchy in the second half of the 17th century.

=== Property conditions and family ===
He inherited estates in Austria from his father, including Kitzbühel with Lebenberg Castle in the Tyrolean Alps, and took over the Amerang estate in Bavaria from his mother. In 1666, he inherited Steyr and Lamberg castle, which became later one of the most luxurious residences in Upper Austria. In 1678, he bought the Kunštát Castle in Moravia, which he immediately passed on to his son Kaspar Friedrich (1648–1686).

In 1635, he married Maria Judith Johanna Eleonora Rebekka von Würben und Freudenthal (1612–1690) in Vienna and had ten children with her. With a purposeful marriage policy, he created an influential aristocratic clan from his family, as five of his daughters married important figures of the Imperial Court. His sons also reached high positions, like his youngest son Johann Philipp von Lamberg (1651–1712), who became Cardinal and Prince-Bishop of Passau.

Johann Maximilian died in December 1682 and he and his wife are buried in the Augustinian Church, Vienna.

== Sources ==
- Ernst Heinrich Kneschke: Neues allgemeines deutsches Adels-Lexicon. Band 5, Voigt, Leipzig 1864, Page 357 (Digitalised).
- Constantin von Wurzbach: "Lamberg, Johann Maximilian Graf von." In: Biographisches Lexikon des Kaiserthums Oesterreich (Biographical Lexicon of the Empire of Austria). Part 14 Kaiserlich-königliche Hof- und Staatsdruckerei, Vienna 1865, p. 30 f. (digitalised).
- Herta Hageneder (1982). "Lamberg, Johann Maximilian Graf". Neue Deutsche Biographie (in German). Vol. 13. Berlin: Duncker & Humblot. pp. 428–429. (full text online).
- Lamberg, Iohann Maximilian Graf von in Zedler Online
