= Charles Albert de Longueval, 3rd Count of Bucquoy =

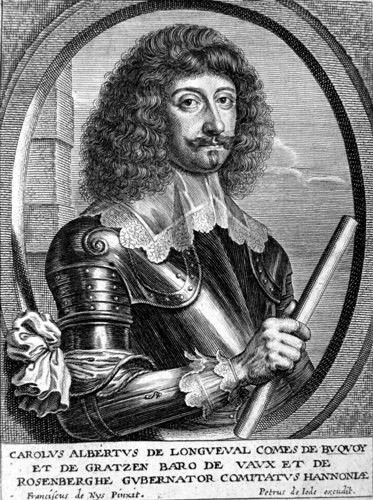
Charles Albert de Longueval, 3rd Count of Bucquoy

Charles II Albert de Longueval, 3rd count of Bucquoy (1607 – 29 March 1663) was a military commander, officeholder, and nobleman in the Habsburg realms of the Low Countries and Bohemia.

== Early life ==
Longueval was born in 1607. He was the son of Charles Bonaventure de Longueval, 2nd Count of Bucquoy, and Maria Magdalena, Countess of Biglia.

== Career ==
He inherited the dominions of his father, Charles I and became 3rd Count of Bucquoy and Lord of Achiet-le-Petit, Vaulx, Puisieux, Gratzen, Rosenberg, Libiegitz, and Farciennes. In 1637, he had Farciennes Castle built.

His military and civil offices included hereditary Master of the Hunt of Artois (1621–1659), captain general, grand bailiff and sovereign governor of the County of Hainaut, governor of Valenciennes, general of artillery, and general of the Spanish cavalry in the Low Countries.

He was a knight of the Order of the Golden Fleece (invested Vienna, 1650) and a commander in the Order of Calatrava.

== Personal life ==
On 5 February 1634 he married Maria Wilhelmine de Croÿ Solre, daughter of Jean, Count of Croÿ Solre and Marie Jeanne de Lalaing. Together, the couple had thirteen children, including:

- Charles Philippe de Longueval (1636–1690), who married Marie Magdaleine de La Pierre de Bousies and Marie Marguerite Françoise van Horne, a daughter of Philippe Lamoraal van Horne, Count of Houtkerke and sister to Albert of Hornes, Bishop of Ghent.
- Albert Charles de Longueval (1637–1714), who married Antonie Renata Czernin von und zu Chudenitz and Elisabeth Polyxena Cavriani, a daughter of Federico Carlo Cavriani and Elisabeth von Meggau.
- Marie Coelestine de Longueval (1639–1680), who married Ferdinand de Mérode, Count of Merode-Montfort, a son of Maximilien Antoine de Mérode, Count of Merode-Montfort, and Anne Françoise Herbertine de Carondelet, Viscountess of Wauremont.
- Marie Eugène Brigitte de Longueval (1654–1714), who married Guillaume François, Count of Argenteau, a son of Guillaume François I d'Argenteau, Lord of Ochain et Avesnes and Marie Antoinette, Countess de La Rivière d'Arschot.
- Marie Madeleine Waudru de Longueval, who married Albert Octave, Prince of t'Serclaes de Tilly, a son of Jean Werner, Count t'Serclaes de Tilly and Marie Françoise de Montmorency de Robecque, and brother of Claude Frédéric t'Serclaes, Count of Tilly.
- Lendelin de Longueval (1658–1691), who married Magdelene Livine de La Pierre-du-Fay, a daughter of Jacques-Ferdinand de La Pierre de Bousies, Baron of Fay.
- Isabelle Marguerite de Longueval (d. 1708), who married Guillaume de Mailly, Marquis du Quesnoy.

The Count died on 29 March 1663 at Mons, Province de Hainaut.
