= 1609 in literature =

This article contains information about the literary events and publications of 1609.

== Events ==
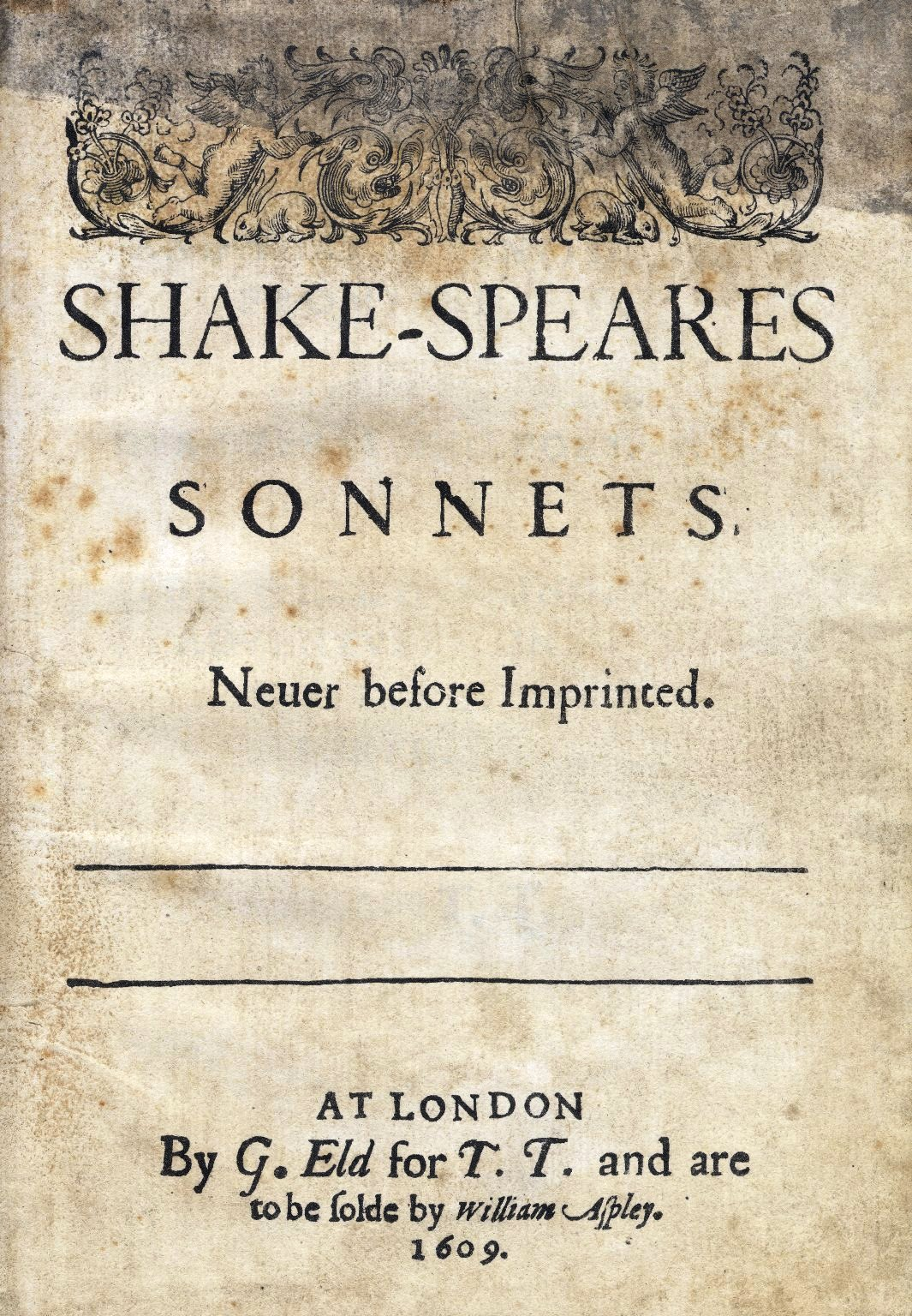

- January 1 – The Children of the Blackfriars perform Thomas Middleton's A Trick to Catch the Old One at the English royal court.
- January 15 – Avisa Relation oder Zeitung, an early newspaper, begins publication in Wolfenbüttel (Holy Roman Empire).
- May 20 – The London publisher Thomas Thorpe issues Shake-speares Sonnets, with a dedication to "Mr. W. H.", and the poem A Lover's Complaint appended. It is unclear whether this has Shakespeare's authority.
- July 28 – The Sea Venture is wrecked in Bermuda – an event thought to be an inspiration for Shakespeare's play The Tempest.
- October 12 – A version of the rhyme "Three Blind Mice" appears in Deuteromelia or The Seconde part of Musicks melodie (London). The editor and possible author of the verse is the teenage Thomas Ravenscroft.
- December 8 – The Sala Fredericiana, the first reading room of the Biblioteca Ambrosiana in Milan, opens. It is one of the first major libraries to have bookshelves ranged along the walls.
- December 21 – William Ames delivers a controversial sermon for St Thomas's Day criticizing the "heathenish debauchery" of Cambridge students during the Twelve Days of Christmas.
- December 24 – John Marston, having retired from writing for the theater, is ordained a priest.
- c. December – Ben Jonson's comedy Epicœne, or The silent woman is premièred at the Whitefriars Theatre in London by the Children of the Queen's Revels led by Nathan Field.
- unknown date – Jacques Auguste de Thou's Historia sui temporis is placed on the Index Librorum Prohibitorum.

== New books ==
=== Prose ===
- Douay–Rheims Bible
- Charles Butler – The Feminine Monarchie, or the History of Bees
- Thomas Dekker
  - Four Birds of Noah's Ark
  - The Gull's Hornbook
- Inca Garcilaso de la Vega – Comentarios Reales de los Incas
- Edward Grimeston – A General History of the Netherlands
- Hugo Grotius – Mare liberum
- Johannes Kepler – Astronomia nova
- Bartolomé Leonardo de Argensola – Conquista de las Islas Molucas
- Marc Lescarbot – Histoire de la Nouvelle-France
- Thomas Middleton
  - Sir Robert Sherley his Entertainment in Cracovia (translation)
  - The Two Gates of Salvation
- William Rowley – A Search for Money
- St. Francis de Sales – Introduction à la vie dévote (Introduction to the Devout Life)
- Wang Qi (王圻) and Wang Siyi (王思义) – Sancai Tuhui (三才圖會, Illustrations of the Three Powers)

=== Drama ===
- Anonymous – Every Woman in Her Humour (published)
- Robert Armin (published)
  - The History of the Two Maids of More-clacke
  - The Italian Tailor and his Boy
- Fulke Greville – Mustapha (published)
- Ben Jonson
  - (and collaborators?) – The Case is Altered (published)
  - Epicœne, or The silent woman
- William Shakespeare (published)
  - Pericles, Prince of Tyre
  - Troilus and Cressida

=== Poetry ===
- Alonso Jerónimo de Salas Barbadillo – La Patrona de Madrid restituida
- George Chapman - Euthymiae Raptus; or the Tears of Peace
- Samuel Daniel – Civil Wars (first complete edition, revised)
- William Shakespeare – The Sonnets and A Lover's Complaint

== Births ==
- February 10 – Sir John Suckling, English poet (died 1642)
- February 18 – Edward Hyde, 1st Earl of Clarendon, English historian (died 1674)
- August 19 – Jean Rotrou, French poet and dramatist (died 1650)
- October 5 – Paul Fleming, German poet (died 1640)
- October 19 – Gerrard Winstanley, English religious and political writer (died 1676)
- December 24 – Philip Warwick, English politician and memoirist (died 1683)
- unknown date – Gauthier de Costes, seigneur de la Calprenède, French novelist and dramatist (died 1663)
- probable – Barbara Blaugdone, English Quaker autobiographer (died 1705)

== Deaths ==
- January 21 – Joseph Justus Scaliger, French Protestant writer (born 1540)
- March 9 – William Warner, English poet (born c. 1558)
- August 22 – Judah Loew ben Bezalel, Jewish mystic and philosopher (born 1525)
- October 19 – Jacobus Arminius, Dutch theologian (born 1560)
- December 4 – Alexander Hume, Scottish poet (born c. 1560)
- December – Barnabe Barnes, English poet (born c. 1571)
