= Regnier de Graaf =

Dutch physician (1641–1673)

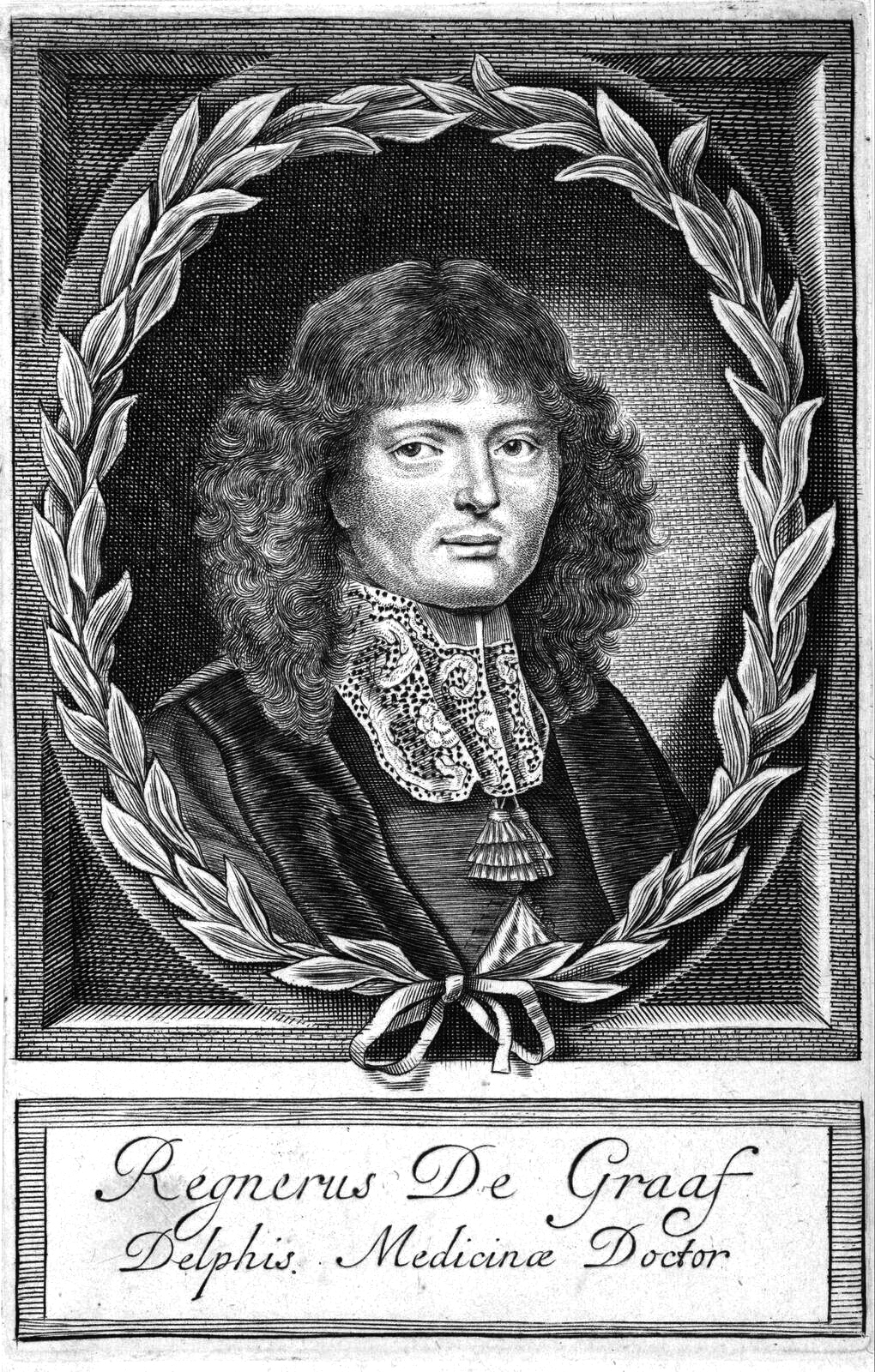
- Born: 30 July 1641; Schoonhoven, Dutch Republic
- Died: 17 August 1673 (aged 32); Delft, Netherlands
- Known for: reproductive biology syringe ovarian follicle
- Scientific career
- Fields: anatomist

Regnier de Graaf (English spelling), original Dutch spelling Reinier de Graaf, or Latinized Reijnerus de Graeff (30 July 1641 – 17 August 1673), was a Dutch physician, physiologist and anatomist who made key discoveries in reproductive biology. He specialized in iatrochemistry and iatrogenesis, and was the first to develop a syringe to inject dye into human reproductive organs so that he could understand their structure and function.

== Biography ==
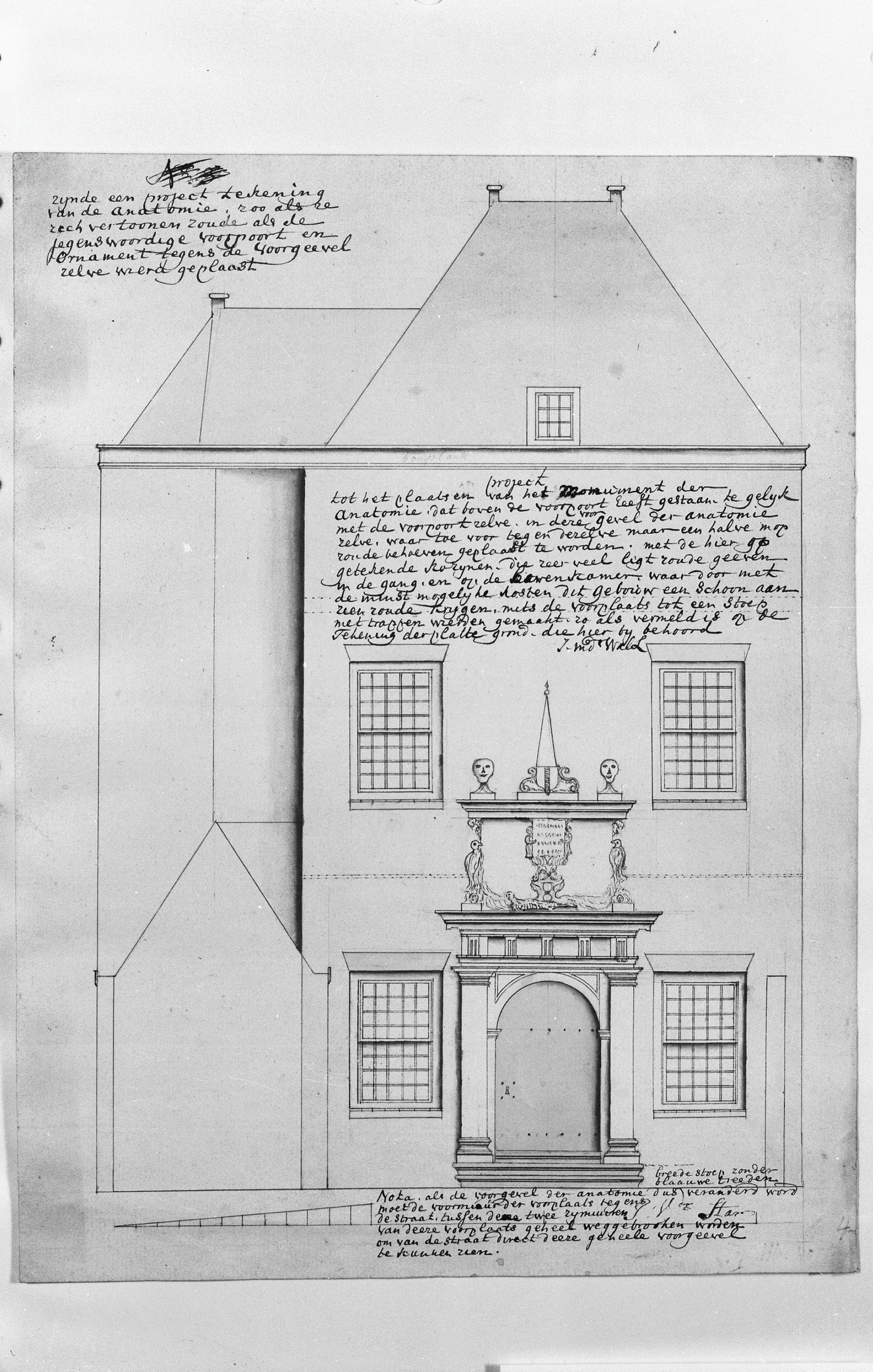
Anatomical theater in Delft. Drawing by J.v.d.Star 1776 - Delft

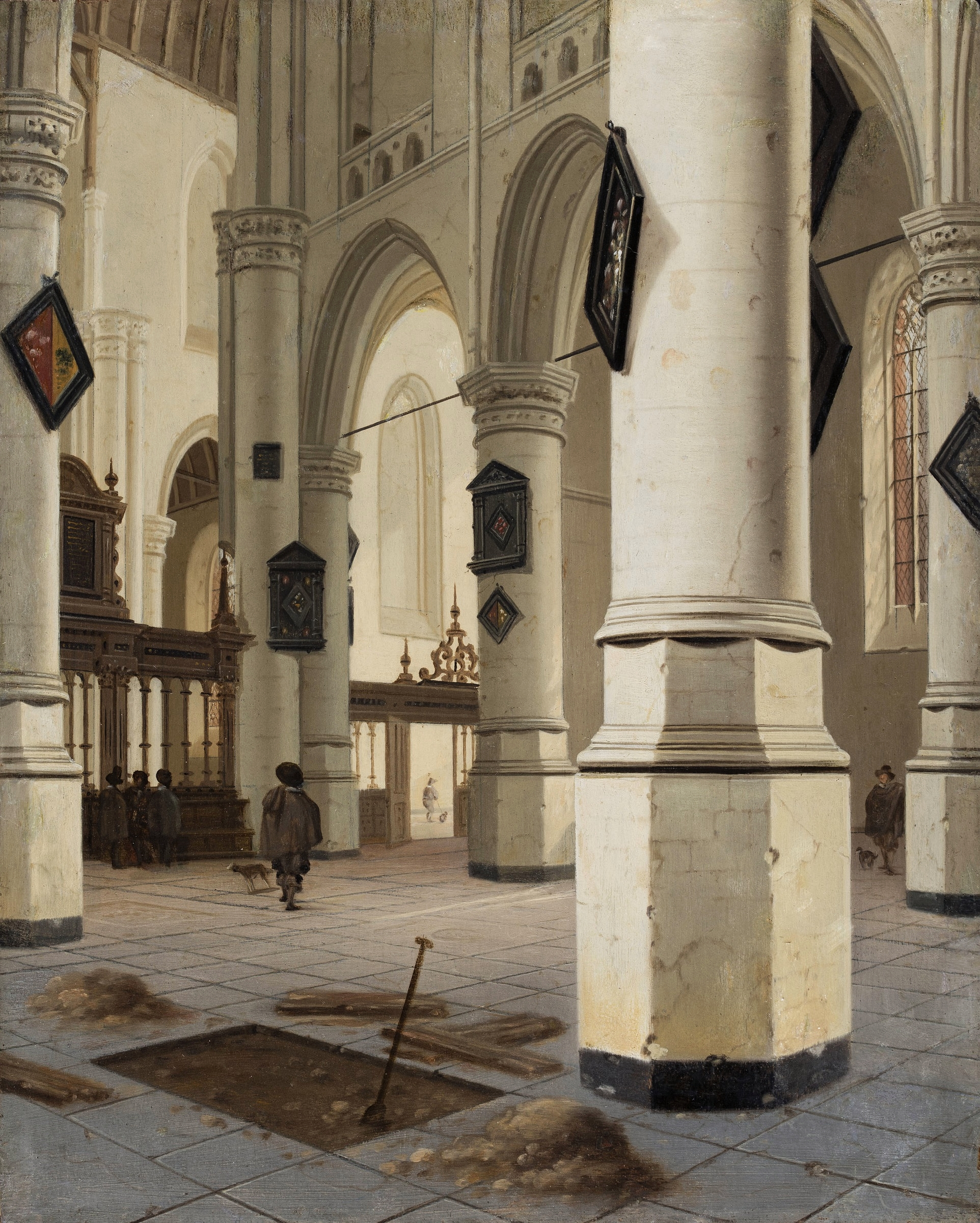
Old Church in Delft by Hendrick Cornelisz. van Vliet

De Graaf was born in Schoonhoven in a Roman Catholic family, as the son of a carpenter/engineer (equivalent to a modern architect). He studied medicine in Leuven (1658), Utrecht and Leiden (1663). There his co-students were Jan Swammerdam, Niels Stensen, Ole Borch and Frederik Ruysch, cooperating with professor Franciscus Sylvius, Johannes van Horne and Lucas Schacht. All of them were interested in the organs of procreation and influenced by René Descartes's iatrophysical approach. He submitted his doctoral thesis on the pancreas, and in 1665 he went (together with his brother) to France where he further experimented on dogs, cooperating with Pierre Bourdelot. He obtained his medical degree from the University of Angers with Jean Chapelain as his translator. Back in the Dutch Republic, De Graaf established himself at Oude Delft. He was studying the male genitalia, which led to a publication in 1668. For his research in the anatomical theatre on the ovarian follicle he used female rabbits. (The dissection of corpses was only done in winter, and cadavers were scarce; most were sent to Leiden and available when someone was condemned to death.)

In May 1672 he married Maria van Dink. As a correspondent of the Royal Society in London, De Graaf recommended (at the end of April) Henry Oldenburg that attention should be paid to autodidact Antonie van Leeuwenhoek and his work on the improvement of the microscope. De Graaf died on 17 August 1673 and was buried respectfully on 21 August in the nearby Old Church, Delft on a prominent spot, at the choir.

It has been speculated that he may have committed suicide, but it is more likely it was malaria, typhoid fever or dysentery as in other Dutch cities; the disease persisted throughout the year, peaking in July and August.

== Legacy ==
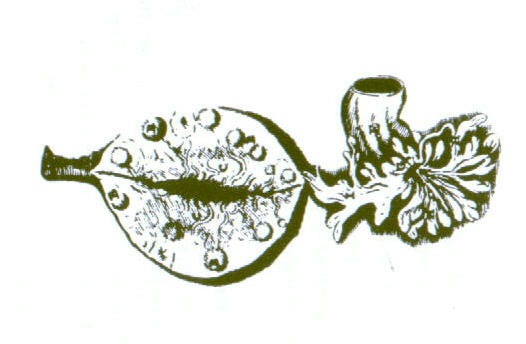
The Ovary by Reinier de Graaf

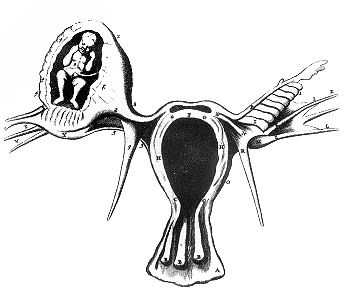
Ectopic pregnancy by Reinier de Graaf, copied, as he acknowledged, from an earlier French publication by Vassal

De Graaf's position in the history of reproduction is unique, summarising the work of anatomists before his time, but unable to benefit from the advances about to be made by microscopy, although he reported its use by Antonie van Leeuwenhoek in 1673. His personal contributions include the description of testicular tubules, the efferent ducts, and corpora lutea. De Graaf may have been the first to understand the reproductive function of the fallopian tube, described the hydrosalpinx, linking its development to female infertility. De Graaf also invented a practical syringe, described in his third treatise.

=== Graafian follicles ===
His eponymous legacy are the Graafian follicles. He himself pointed out that he was not the first to describe them, but described their development. From the observation of pregnancy in rabbits, he concluded that the follicle contained the oocyte, although he never observed it. The mature stage of the ovarian follicle is called the Graafian follicle in his honor, although others, including Fallopius, had noticed the follicles previously (but failed to recognize its reproductive significance). The term Graafian follicle followed the introduction of the term ova Graafiana by Albrecht von Haller who like De Graaf still assumed that the follicle was the oocyte itself, although De Graaf realized the ovum was much smaller. The discovery of the human egg was eventually made by Karl Ernst von Baer in 1827. De Graaf's contemporary Jan Swammerdam confronted him after his publication of DeMulierum Organis Generatione Inservientibu and accused him of taking credit of discoveries he and Johannes van Horne had made earlier regarding the importance of the ovary and its eggs. De Graaf issued a rebuttal but was affected by the accusation of plagiarism.

=== Female ejaculation ===
De Graaf described female ejaculation and referred to an erogenous zone in the vagina that he himself linked with the male prostate; this zone was later reported by German gynecologist Ernst Gräfenberg and named after him as the Gräfenberg Spot or G-Spot. Further, De Graaf described the anatomy of the testicles and collected secretions of the gall bladder and the pancreas.

=== Weaknesses ===
Despite his contributions, De Graaf made a number of errors in addition to believing that the ovum was the follicle. He never actually consulted the ancient texts but merely repeated the accounts of others compounding their inaccuracies. Because he observed rabbits rather than humans, he assumed fertilization took place in the ovary. He believed that the seminal vesicles stored spermatozoa. He was not yet aware of the presence of spermatozoa as such; these were discovered just after his death by the Amsterdam student Johannes Ham, using the microscope of Antonie van Leeuwenhoek. Based upon his rabbit experiments and the description of ectopic pregnancy in a lady that had died in her 12th pregnancy in Paris, he assumed that the complete entity was present in the ovary, brought to life by the influence of the male ejaculatory fluid, and then transported to the uterus.

== Publications ==
- De Graaf, R (1664) De succi pancreatici natura et usu exercitatio anatomico-medica
- De Graaf, R (1668) De Virorum Organis Generationi Inservientibus, de Clysteribus et de Usu Siphonis in Anatomia
- De Graaf, R (1672) De mulierum organis generationi inservientibus tractatus novus : demonstrans tam homines & animalia caetera omnia, quae vivipara dicuntur, haud minus quàm ovipara ab ovo originem ducere
- De Graaf, R (1686) Alle de Wercken. Leyden, Netherlands.

== Other sources ==
- Houtzager HL. Reinier de Graaf 1641–1673 (Dutch). Rotterdam: Erasmus publishing, 1991. ISBN 90-5235-021-3.
- Houtzager HL (2000). "Reinier De Graaf and his contribution to reproductive biology". European Journal of Obstetrics, Gynecology, and Reproductive Biology. 90 (2): 125–7. doi:10.1016/S0301-2115(00)00258-X. PMID 10825629.
- Modlin IM; Director Gastric Pathobiology Group (2000). "Regnier de Graaf: Paris, purging, and the pancreas". Journal of Clinical Gastroenterology. 30 (2): 109–13. doi:10.1097/00004836-200003000-00001. PMID 10730914.
- Longo LD; Degraaf, R (1996). "De mulierum organis generationi inservientibus tractatus novus". American Journal of Obstetrics and Gynecology. 174 (2): 794–5. doi:10.1016/S0002-9378(96)70467-2. PMID 8623824.
- Wiesemann C (1991). "Regnier de Graaf (1641–1673)" [Regnier de Graaf (1641–1673)]. Der Pathologe (in German). 12 (6): 352–3. PMID 1792221.
- Houtzager HL (1981). "Reinier de Graaf". European Journal of Obstetrics, Gynecology, and Reproductive Biology. 12 (6): 385–7. doi:10.1016/0028-2243(81)90083-6. PMID 7037492.
- Gysel C (1978). "Reinier de Graaf (1641–1673) and the syringe" [Reinier de Graaf (1641–1673) and the syringe]. Nederlands Tijdschrift voor Tandheelkunde (in Dutch). 85 (5): 216–8. PMID 379667.
- Mann RJ (1976). "Regnier de Graaf, 1641–1673, investigator". Fertility and Sterility. 27 (4): 466–8. doi:10.1016/s0015-0282(16)41788-7. PMID 773713.
- Lindenboom GA (May 1974). "Reinier de Graaf (1641–1673)" [Reinier de Graaf (1641–1673)]. Nederlands Tijdschrift voor Geneeskunde (in Dutch). 118 (21): 789–95. PMID 4597505.
- "Reinier de Graaf and the Royal Society of London" [Reinier de Graaf and the Royal Society of London]. Nederlands Tijdschrift voor Geneeskunde (in Dutch). 117 (28): 1049–55. 1973. PMID 4595333.
- Lindberg J (1963). "Regnier de GRAAF" [Regnier de GRAAF]. Nordisk Medicin (in Swedish). 69: 108–12. ISSN 0029-1420. PMID 13930746.
- Ruler Han van (2003). 'Graaf, Reinier de (1641-73)' The Dictionary of 17th and 18th-Century Dutch Philosophers. Bristol: Thoemmes, 2003, vol. 1, 348–9. ISBN 1-85506-966-0.
- Ruler Han van (2007). 'Graaf, Reinier de' Dictionary of Medical Biography. Westport, Conn.: Greenwood, 2007, vol. 2, 570.
- Speert H (1956). "Obstetric-gynecologic eponyms; Reinier de Graaf and the graafian follicles". Obstetrics and Gynecology. 7 (5): 582–8. PMID 13309944.
