= Alberto Octavio Tserclaes de Tilly =

Spanish general of Walloon origins

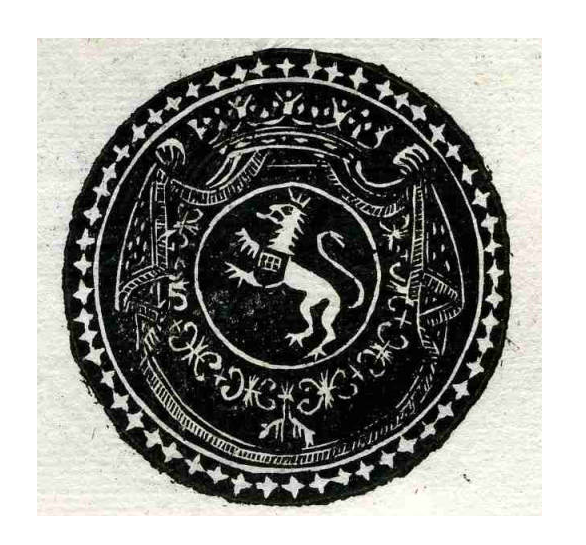

Prince Alberto Octavio t'Serclaes de Tilly (also known as Antonio; 1646 – 10 September 1715) was a Spanish general of Walloon origins.

== Early life ==
Alberto was born in 1646. He was the son of Jean Werner T'Serclaes Tilly Marbais and Marie Françoise de Montmorency de Robecque. His brother, Claude Frédéric t'Serclaes, served in the Army of the Dutch Republic.

His paternal grandfather, was the brother of General Johann Tserclaes Count of Tilly, who acquired fame in the Thirty Years War.

== Career ==
In 1693, he was granted the title of prince by King Charles II of Spain. He took part in the Spanish War of Succession (1701–1714) on the side of the young French-born Prince, later King Philip V of Spain against his opponent Charles VI of Austria of the Habsburgs. He fought in the Portuguese campaign during 1704, during which he advanced along the left bank of the river Tagus, conquering Portalegre and consolidating the Alentejo region, while the young Philip and James FitzJames, 1st Duke of Berwick advanced along the right bank of the river.

In 1705, there was a conspiracy in which Diego Dávila Mesía y Guzmán, Captain General of Catalonia, sided with Charles of Austria. Alberto Octavio warned the central authorities. For this assistance, Philip V of Spain bestowed upon him in 1706 the title of Grandee of Spain, a title which included the privilege of remaining covered or seated in the presence of royalty.

Antonio Octavio served as Viceroy of Navarre in 1706–1709 and as Captain General of Aragon from 1711 to 1714. In 1714, he was appointed Captain General of Catalonia, replacing FitzJames. He died in Barcelona the following year.

== Personal life ==
T'Serclaes was married to Marie Madeleine Waudru de Longueval, a daughter of Charles Albert de Longueval, 3rd Count of Bucquoy and Maria Wilhelmine de Croÿ Solre (a daughter of Jean, Count of Croÿ Solre). Together, they were the parents of:

- Madeleine Marie Françoise t'Serclaes, Countess of Tilly (1676–1700), who married Charles de Chabot, Count of Saint Maurice.
- Prince Thomas Dominique Martin t'Serclaes de Tilly.
- Charles Joseph t'Serclaes, Count of Tilly (1684–1689), who died young.
- Antoine Ignace t'Serclaes, Count of Tilly, who died unmarried.

With Alexandrine Josephe de Bacq, he was the father of a natural daughter:

- Albertine Josèphe t'Serclaes de Tilly (1703–1765), who married José Francisco Ruiz de Castro y del Castillo.

The Prince died in Barcelona on 10 September 1715.
