= The Feminine Monarchie, or the History of Bees =

1609 science treatise Charles Butler

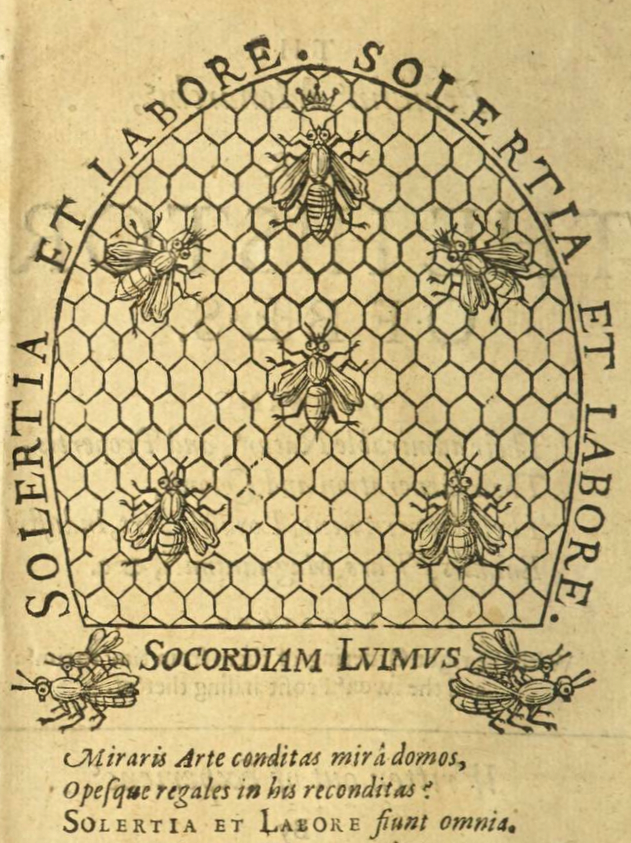

The Feminine Monarchie, or the History of Bees is a 1609 science treatise by the English naturalist and apiarist Charles Butler. It is considered the first work on the science of beekeeping in the English language.

The book was published four times in English in 1609, 1623, 1634 and 1704 and a Latin translation was printed in 1673 (Monarchia foeminina sive apum historia). The 1634 edition had ten chapters:

- The nature and properties of bees and of their queen
- Bee gardens and seats for the hives
- The hives and the dressing of them
- Breeding of bees and drones
- Swarming and hiving of them
- Their works
- Their enemies
- Feeding them
- Removing them
- Fruit and profit of them.

The text brought into the public consciousness that a bee colony is presided over by a queen bee (noticed by Luis Mendez de Torres in 1586, and later conclusively proven by Jan Swammerdam). Butler also provided information on the keeping and forming of skeps, as well as his own personal enjoinders on the most effective beekeeping techniques. The book was the authoritative text on the topic for over two centuries, before the invention of the moveable comb made it somewhat obsolete. The book is organized into ten chapters. It also contains a madrigal of Butler's: "The Queen bee's song". The book sustained at least one further edition edited by Butler released in 1629. Another musical excursus of Butler's was an attempt to musically notate the "piping" noises of the queen bee.
