= Robert of Saint-Omer, 1st Count of Morbecque =

Flemish noble lord who became 1st Count of Morbecque and 1st Baron of Robecq

Robert of Saint-Omer (+1617) was a Flemish noble lord who became 1st Count of Morbecque and 1st Baron of Robecq.

== Family ==
He was born in the family of Saint-Omer, only son of John of Saint-Omer, lord of Morbecque and Madeleine de la Tramerie. He married Anne of Croy, but they died without heirs. He was succeeded by his niece, who married Louis of Montmorency. He died in his castle and was buried in the church of Morbecque.

== Functions ==
In his honour the archdukes allowed him to elevate Morbecque in a county by decree of 8 February 1614. However he was the last member of his family to possess the rights of Robecque. Since then the house of Montmorency took possession of Robecq

Belgian nobility
Preceded by Louis of Saint-Omer	1st Count of Morbecque	Succeeded by
Preceded by Louis of Saint-Omer	1st Baron of Robecque	Succeeded by John V of Saint-Omer, 2nd Baron of Robecque
