= Olivier Carette =

Belgian footballer and futsal player

Personal information
- Date of birth: 31 December 1967 (age 58)
- Place of birth: Farciennes, Belgium
- Position: Forward

Youth career
- –: FC Farciennes

Senior career*
Years	Team	Apps	(Gls)
1984–1988	Racing Jet de Bruxelles		
1988–1990	K.S.K. Beveren	53	(0)
1990–1992	R.F.C. Seraing		
1992–1993	FC Farciennes		
1993–1996	R. Francs Borains		
1996–2000	FC Farciennes		

International career
–	Belgium U21		
- * Club domestic league appearances and goals

Olivier Carette (born 31 December 1967) is a Belgian former association football and futsal player. With Racing Jet he promoted to the Belgian League in 1986, and he also played in the Belgian top flight for K.S.K. Beveren.
