= Farciennes Castle =

17th-century castle in Belgium

- Farciennes, Wallonia, Belgium
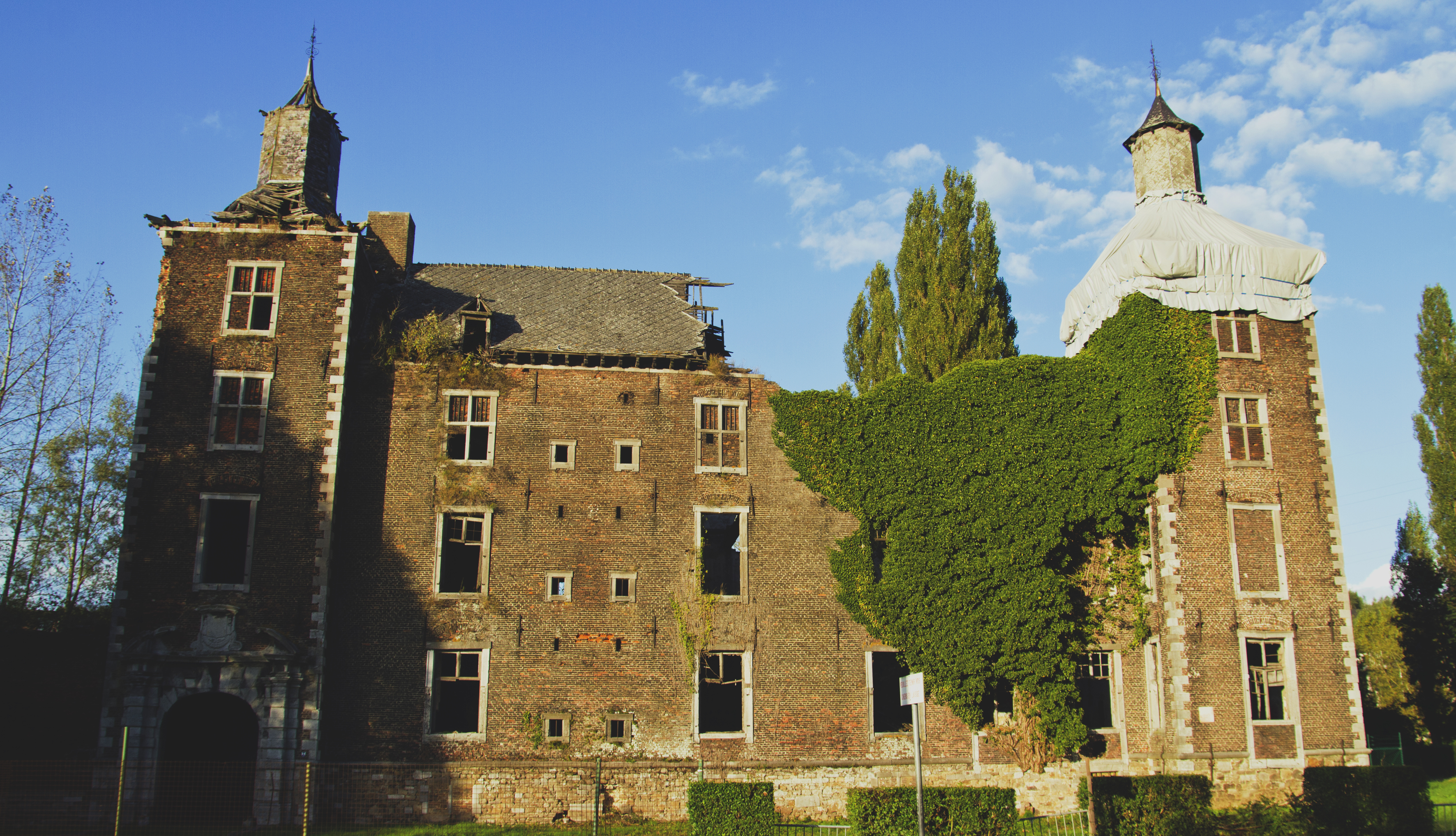

Site information
- Type: Castle
- Owner: Municipality of Farciennes
- Condition: Derelict

Location
- Coordinates: 50.427°N 4.557°E

Farciennes Castle (French: Château de Farciennes) is a derelict 17th-century castle in Farciennes in the province of Hainaut, Wallonia, Belgium. The present building stands on the site of an earlier castle of the 14th century.

== History ==
The first record of the castle at Farciennes dates from 1344, when Adolf van der Marck, Prince-Bishop of Liège, gave Hendrik of Farciennes permission to restore and strengthen his castle. On 23 September 1408 the united armies of John III, Duke of Bavaria (John the Pitiless), at that time Prince-Bishop of Liège, and his brother William II, Duke of Bavaria, defeated the rebellious citizens of Liège in battle on the plain of Russon. The victors ordered that the strongholds in the area be dismantled, which included the castle of Farciennes.

The remains of the stronghold changed hands several times until Charles Albert de Longueval became owner. He ordered the demolition of what was left of the medieval structure and erected a new aristocratic castle on the same spot in the year 1630. However, he never saw it finished, as he died before its completion in 1676.

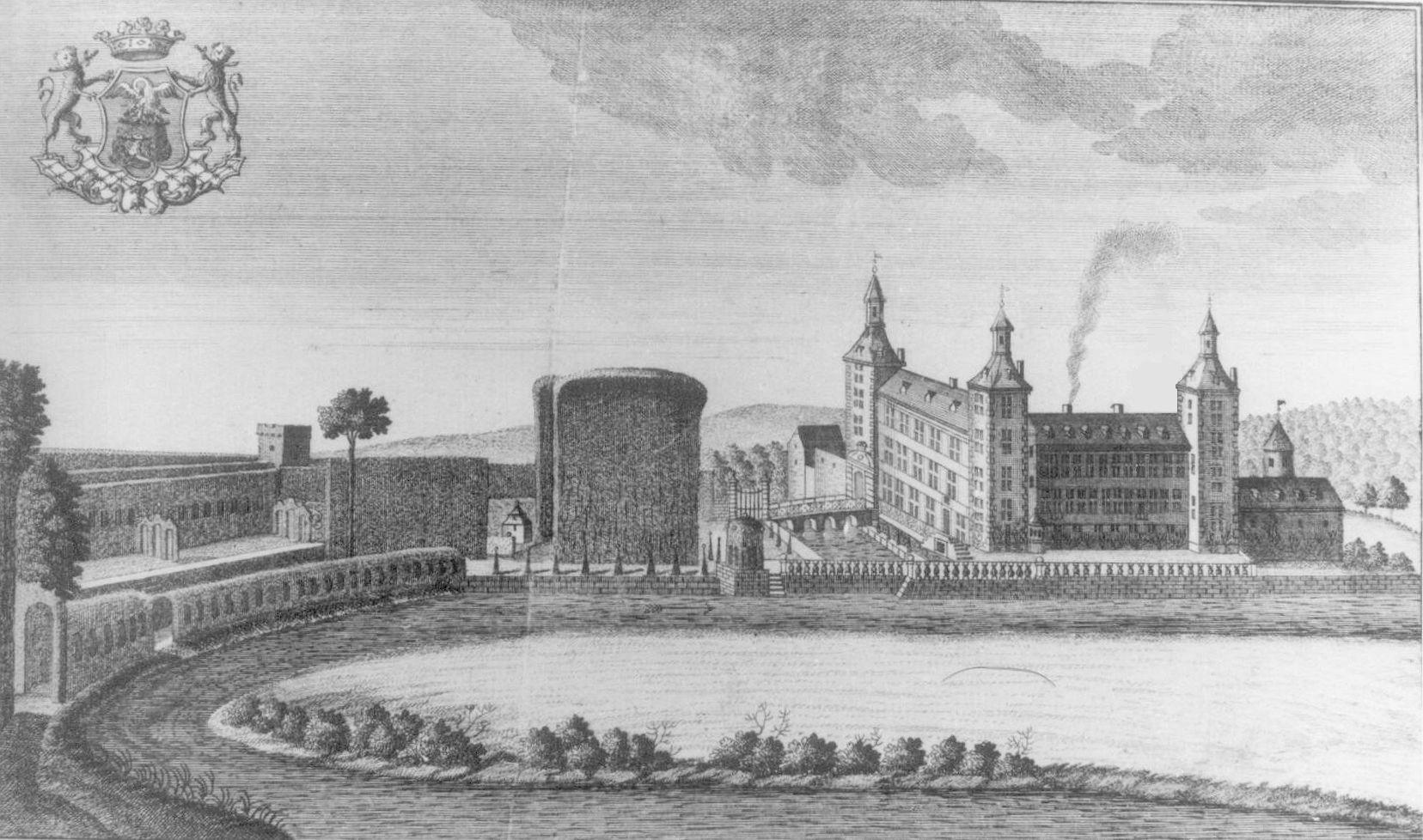
The castle in an 18th-century engraving

Marie-Emmanuelle de Longueval, Countess of Bouquoi, married Albert-Maximilien, Count de Fours, and so the castle passed to the de Fours family. It was badly damaged by pillaging armies during the French Revolution. Count François de Fours was however able to keep the castle out of the French hands with a sales trick.

In 1809 the Count de Fours, the last lord of Farciennes, sold the castle to Gabriel Scarsez, a lawyer from Mons, but he lacked the means to maintain an estate like Farciennes in good condition, so the building gradually began to decay. Finally, large parts of the surrounding park were sold and factories built on the land. The castle started to show cracks as a result of the coal mines causing the ground below to subside. The building was rented out and was turned into a starch factory. In the meantime the beautiful interior was plundered and the contents scattered throughout the world.

In 1860 the castle was turned into a farm. A part was set aside for living quarters and some of the big ballrooms housed the cows and pigs.

Neglect and ill-treatment continued unchecked, even though the castle was classed as a structure of national importance in 1926, until eventually, in 2008, the town of Farciennes bought what remained of the building, which was only a skeleton of what was once was a beautiful estate. Large parts of the building have collapsed and there is nothing that can save the castle from inevitable destruction.

== See also ==
- List of castles in Belgium
