= Du Quesnoy =

French noble family

du Quesnoy
- Noble family
- Argent a lion rampant gules within an orle of nine acorns vert.
- Country: France
- Origin: Normandy

The du Quesnoy family is a French noble house of medieval and chivalric lineage.

== Origin ==
The family originated in Normandy and was first mentioned in a Papal Bull issued by Pope Alexander III, dated May 17, 1181, to acknowledge its endowment of the Priory of Saint-Lô du Bourg-Achard; its lineage, however, has only been established since 1378.
Near the mid-sixteenth century, the family was divided in two main branches, which are now extinct. The cadet branch, extant until 1897, was raised to a barony by King Louis XIII in August 1636, and elevated to the rank of marquis in July 1714.

== Works cited ==
- (French) Fr.-A. de La Chesnaye des Bois et J. Badier, Dictionnaire de la noblesse : contenant les généalogies, l'histoire et la chronologie des familles nobles de France, t. XVI, 1870, 3e éd. (BnF 34209079, read online), p. 615-623.
- (French) H. Jougla de Morenas et R. de Warren, Grand armorial de France, t. V, 1948 (BnF 34209165, read online), p. 407 (no. 28.002).
