= Luis Méndez de Torres =

16th-century Spanish entomologist

Luis Méndez de Torres was a Spanish entomologist who first observed that the largest bee in the colony was an egg-laying female and not a male king as previously thought. In his 1586 treatise "Short Tractate on the Cultivation and Care of Beehives" he did not use the term "queen bee", but "maessa de enjambre" which means "mistress of the swarm". In the English speaking world this idea was first introduced by Charles Butler, and this discovery was conclusively proven when Jan Swammerdam discovered the female reproductive organs in the queen bee by microscopic dissection. He also published an overview of the laws concerning beekeeping in Seville.
