= Farciennes =

Municipality in Hainaut Province, Wallonia, Belgium

Farciennes Fårcene (Walloon)
- Municipality
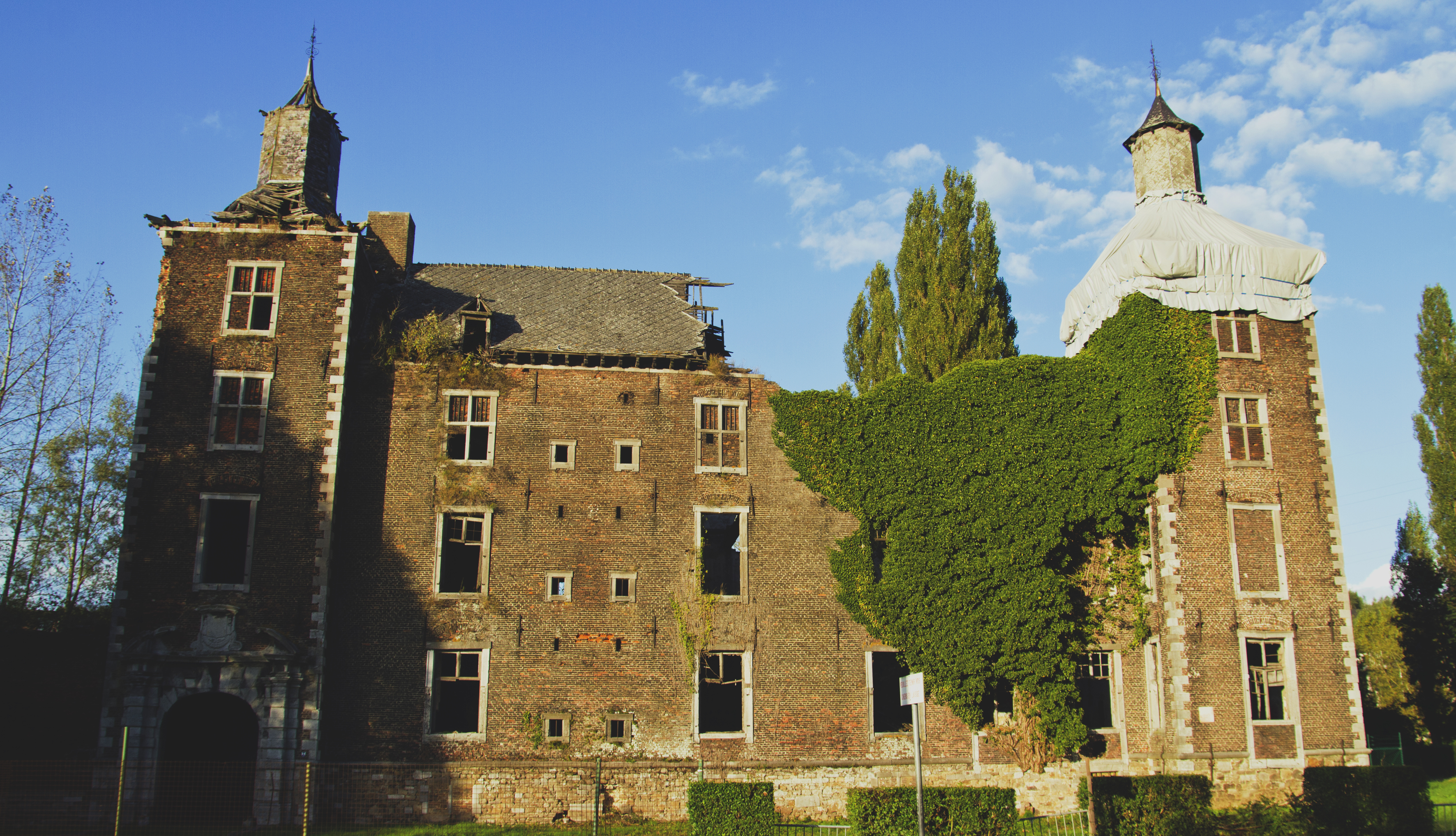
- Farciennes Castle

- Flag Coat of arms

- Location of Farciennes in Hainaut
- Interactive map of Farciennes
- Location in Belgium
- Coordinates: 50°26′N 04°33′E
- Country: Belgium
- Community: French Community
- Region: Wallonia
- Province: Hainaut
- Arrondissement: Charleroi

Government
  - Mayor: Hugues Bayet (PS)
  - Governing party: PS

Area
  - Total: 10.37 km^{2} (4.00 sq mi)

Population (2018-01-01)
  - Total: 11,247
  - Density: 1,085/km^{2} (2,809/sq mi)
- Postal codes: 6240
- NIS code: 52018
- Area codes: 071
- Website: www.farciennes.be

Farciennes (French pronunciation: [faʁsjɛn]; Walloon: Fårcene) is a municipality of Wallonia located in the province of Hainaut, Belgium.

On January 1, 2018, Farciennes had a total population of 11,247. The total area is 10.39 km^{2} which gives a population density of 1,083 inhabitants per km^{2}. It is located on the entre-Sambre-et-Meuse in the periphery of Charleroi.

The municipality consists of the following districts: Farciennes and Pironchamps. The boroughs of Wainage, Wairchat and Tergnée are part of the district of Farciennes.

In the past, Farciennes was an industrial city. It declined with the closure of the last Walloon coal mine, namely the Sainte-Catherine shaft of the Roton company, and the fall of the iron and steel industries, formerly large employers in the area between Liège and Charleroi. Today, the site of Roton, of which only the tower and the cloakroom remain, has been developed to accommodate small and medium-sized businesses.

== Notable people ==
- Olivier Carette, footballer
- Laurent Ciman, footballer

== See also ==
- Municipalities of Belgium
- Communities, regions and provinces of Belgium
