= Charles Butler (beekeeper) =

English vicar, naturalist, philologist, musician, and beekeeper

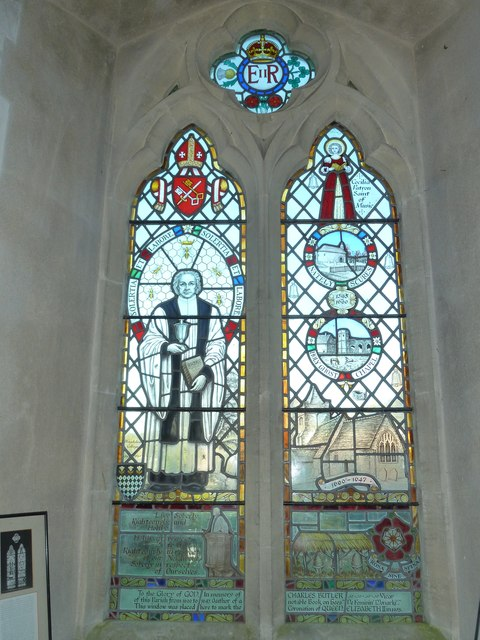
- Butler depicted on stained glass in Wootton St Lawrence church
- Born: 1571; Buckinghamshire, England
- Died: 29 March 1647 (aged 75–76); Wootton St Lawrence, England
- Occupation: Beekeeper
- Known for: Father of English Beekeeping

Charles Butler (1571 – 29 March 1647), sometimes called the Father of English Beekeeping, was a logician, grammarian, author, priest (Vicar of Wootton St Lawrence, near Basingstoke, England), and an influential beekeeper. He was also an early proponent of English spelling reform. He observed that bees produce wax combs from scales of wax produced in their own bodies; and he was among the first to assert that drones are male and the queen female, though he believed worker bees lay eggs.

== Biography ==
Butler was born into a poor family in Buckinghamshire, South East England, but became a boy chorister at Magdalen College, Oxford at the age of eight. At the age of ten, he matriculated, taking his BA in 1584 and his MA in 1587. In 1593, Butler became Rector of Nately Scures in Hampshire in 1593 and in 1595 became also Master at the Holy Ghost School, Basingstoke. He resigned to accept an incumbency at Wootton St Lawrence in 1600 and served that rural post until his death on 29 March 1647. He was buried in an unmarked grave in the chancel of his church.

== Beekeeping ==
Butler was engaged in beekeeping at his rural parsonage in Hampshire and made the first recorded observations about the generation of beeswax, which was previously thought to be gathered by honeybees from plant materials. He was not the first to describe the largest honeybee as a queen, rather than king - a distinction usually granted to Spaniard Luis Mendez de Torres for his 1586 observation, which was confirmed by Swammerdam's later microscopic dissections. However, Butler popularized the notion with his classic book The Feminine Monarchie, 1609. Butler may have misinterpreted the queen's function when he found queenless colonies sometimes develop eggs laid by "laying workers", however there is no doubt he saw the queen as an Amazonian ruler of the hive. As an influential beekeeper and author, his assertion that drones are male and workers female was quickly accepted. For his discoveries and his book, Butler is sometimes called the Father of English Beekeeping.

=== The Feminine Monarchie ===
The Feminine Monarchie, originally published by Joseph Barnes, Oxford, in 1609, is the first full-length English-language book about beekeeping. It remained a valid and practical guide for beekeepers for two hundred fifty years, until Langstroth and others developed and promoted moveable comb hives. Butler revised The Feminine Monarchie in 1623 and 1634. It was translated into Latin in 1678 and 1682, then from Latin back to English again in 1704. The title expresses Butler's main idea that the colony is governed, not by a king-bee, as Aristotle claimed, but by a queen-bee. The last edition written by Butler contains ten chapters, including sections regarding bee gardens, hive-making materials, swarm catching, enemies of bees, feeding bees, and the benefits of bees to fruit (pollination). The book gives an excellent account of skep beekeeping, including methods of predicting - from tone pitch of the buzzing bees - when swarming might occur. Butler even transliterated the tones and included the Bees' Madrigal on a musical score in the 1623 edition. He further suggested that musicians may trace the roots of music back to the sounds of the hive.

== Spelling reform ==
Charles Butler published The English grammar (1633) with proposals to improve spelling to a phonetic alphabet. In his book, Butler condemned the vagaries of traditional English spelling and proposed the adoption of a system whereby 'men should write altogeđer according to đe sound now generally received'. The 1634 edition of his beekeeping classic was written and published in his new orthography.

== Other writings ==
Butler authored a bestselling school textbook, The Logic of Ramus (1597), an introduction to the philosophy of the Protestant French contemporary Pierre de la Ramée. He also published a book on music theory, The principles of musik in singing and setting (1636), and a theological defence of marriage between first cousins, coinciding with the engagement and subsequent marriage of his daughter to his nephew.
