= Raoul de Warren =

French writer and historian (1905–1992)

Raoul de Warren (born 5 September 1905 in Lyon - d. 5 March 1992 in Paris) was a French writer, historian, genealogist and lawyer. He was the President of the Evidence Commission for the Association d'entraide de la noblesse française (Mutual Aid Association of the French nobility).

== Family ==
Raoul de Warren's father, William de Warren, was a descendant of a Jacobite family that moved to Nancy in 1692, after the deposition of king James II of England. His mother, Marie Seguin, was the granddaughter of Marc Seguin, a member of the Institut de France, builder of the first steamship in France, inventor of boilers, railroads and suspension bridges. Raoul de Warren married Marie de Montrichard.

== Career ==
Raoul de Warren obtained a Bachelor of Arts degree in history and geography, and became a Doctor of Law, specializing in agricultural issues. His honors thesis, Ireland and its political institutions (1928) won an award from the Institut de France. However, the Irish minister in Paris did not consider the thesis of any great value. His first work of fiction was a short psychological drama published in 1926, while he was studying at Nancy. In 1934 he published a new novel entitled Un jour comme tous les autres (A day like any other) developing the theme of premonition.

Raoul de Warren has been recognized as a leading authority on the French nobility. He became Secretary General of the Federation of French Heraldry and Genealogy. The Genealogy Society of Loir-et-Cher was created in 1966 by Raoul de Warren and Michael de Sachy. It is the oldest genealogical society in France, after Paris.

== Reception ==
The Romanian poet and novelist Jean Parvulesco has described de Warren's works of fiction as inspiring and "mediumistic". A review of his novel L'insolite aventure de Marina Sloty, which involves time travel and romance, describes the novel as "a true success" and "excellent".

== Bibliography ==
=== Historical works ===
- Histoire du fief de La Rochelle (History of the fief of La Rochelle). 1934.
- With Henry Jougla de Morenas (1934–1952). Grand Armorial de France, 7 volumes. Paris: Editions Heraldic.
- Claude Francois, Comte de Briqueville. 1936.
- With Aymon de Lestrange
  - Énigmes et controverses historiques, Les prétendants au trône de France (Riddles and historical controversies, the pretenders to the throne of France). SGAF. 1947.
  - Les Prétendants au trône de France. Faits nouveaux. Prétendants nouveaux (The Pretenders to the throne of France. Developments. New contenders). SGAF. 1955.
  - Les Prétendants au trône de France (The Pretenders to the throne of France). Edition de l'Herne. 1991. ISBN 2-85197-281-2.
- Comte Roland de Montrichard. Trois siècles de parentés, 1640-1940 (Count Roland of Montrichard. Three centuries of kinship), SGAF, 1953.
- Les Pairs de France, sous l'Ancien Régime, les Cahiers nobles (Peers of France under the Old Regime, the noble families). 1958.
- Les Pairs de France au XIXe siècle, les Cahiers nobles (Peers of France in the 19th century, the noble families). 1959.
- La Maison de Warren, 1138-1964 (The House of Warren, 1138-1964). 1964.
- La Seigneurie de Monnet au Comté de Bourgogne (The Lordship of Monnet in the County of Burgundy. 1962.
- La Terre de Saint-Gervais au Val de Loire (The Land of St. Gervais in the Loire Valley. 1965.
- Les Comtes de Blois (The Counts of Blois). The French Federation of genealogy, heraldry and Sigillography. Circle Family Centre. 1971.
- Le château de Frontenay au Comté de Bourgogne (Castle Frontenay the County of Burgundy, Frontenay. 1972.

=== Fiction ===
- L'énigme du mort-vivant, ou le mystère de la nativité julienne (The Riddle of the undead, or the mystery of the julienne nativity). Bordas. 1947. ISBN 2-85197-807-1.
- La bête de l'apocalypse (The Beast of the Apocalypse). Laffont. 1956.
- La pendule (The clock). 1959.
- Le village assassin (The village assassin). AELP. 1967. ISBN 2-85197-812-8.
- Glaces et neiges, bénissez le seigneur (Ice and snow, bless the Lord). AELP. 1967.
- La clairière des Eaux-Mortes (Clearing the dead waters). Edition de l'Herne. 1980. ISBN 2-251-77121-2.
- L'insolite aventure de Marina Sloty (The unusual story of Marina Sloty). Edition de l'Herne. 1981. ISBN 2-85197-810-1.
- La rue du Mort-qui-trompe (The street of Wrongful Death). Edition de l'Herne. 1984.
- Et le glas tinta trois fois (And the bell rang three times). Edition de l'Herne. 1989. ISBN 2-85197-813-6.
- Les portes de l'Enfer (The gates of Hell). Edition de l'Herne. 1991. ISBN 2-85197-814-4.

=== Other ===
- Social insurance and the allowance for elderly employed in agriculture, the agricultural social Publications, 1943.
