= Johannes van Horne =

Dutch anatomist (1621-1670)

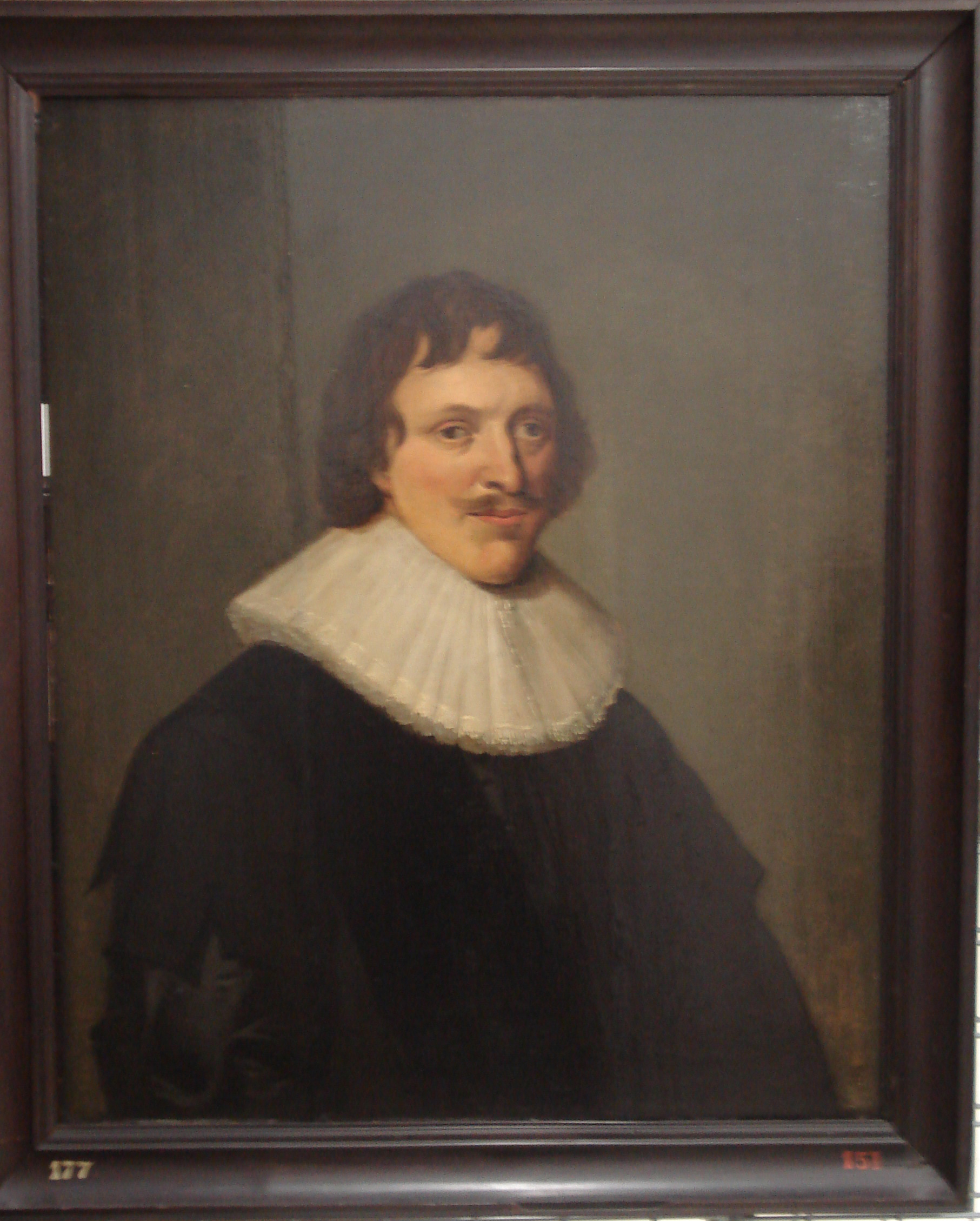

Johannes van Horne, Joannis van Horne (surname Latinized as Hornius, 2 September 1621 – 5 January 1670) was a Dutch anatomist best known for his illustrated atlas of myology. He was a professor of anatomy and surgery at Leiden University where his students included Nicolaus Steno.

== Biography ==
Van Horne was born in Amsterdam in a Flemish merchant family. His father Jacob was a director of the Dutch East India Company. Educated at the University of Leiden he shifted from literature to medicine and may have assisted Johannes de Wale. He then went to study medicine at Utrecht under Willem van der Straaten. He then travelled around Europe, attending Johann Vesling's classes at Padua, Marco Aurelio Severino at Naples, and visiting Montpellier and England. He received an honorary degree from the University of Basel. After returning home, he became a demonstrator of anatomy at Leiden University and became an extraordinary professor of anatomy in 1651. He was made full professor at Leiden University in 1652 when he succeeded Otto Heurnius. The next year he became professor of anatomy and surgery. His notable students included Nicolaus Steno, Frederik Ruysch, and Jan Swammerdam. Van Horne developed fine anatomical preparation techniques and began to describe human musculature in detail, making use of the painter Marten Sagemolen. He associated with Louis de Bils and came up with incorrect ideas on the digestive tract leading later to a polemic exchange. He published several books on surgery but his work on an atlas of myology, known only from a manuscript of which is in France is considered particularly influential. This was considered lost until it was rediscovered in 2016. The work helped establish the role of careful artistic illustration in anatomical books and instruction, particularly through the influence of students such as Steno.

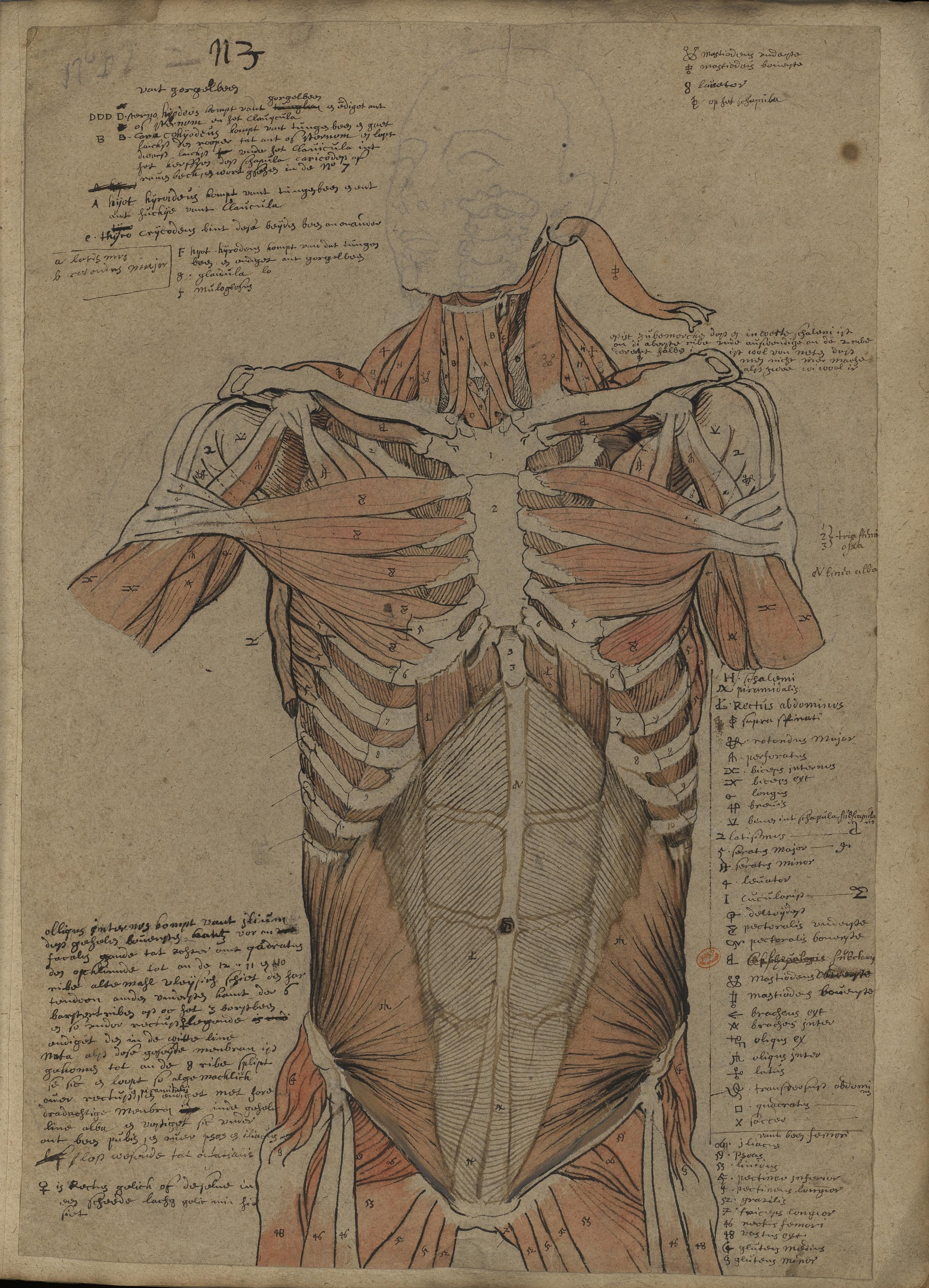
Muscles of the trunk

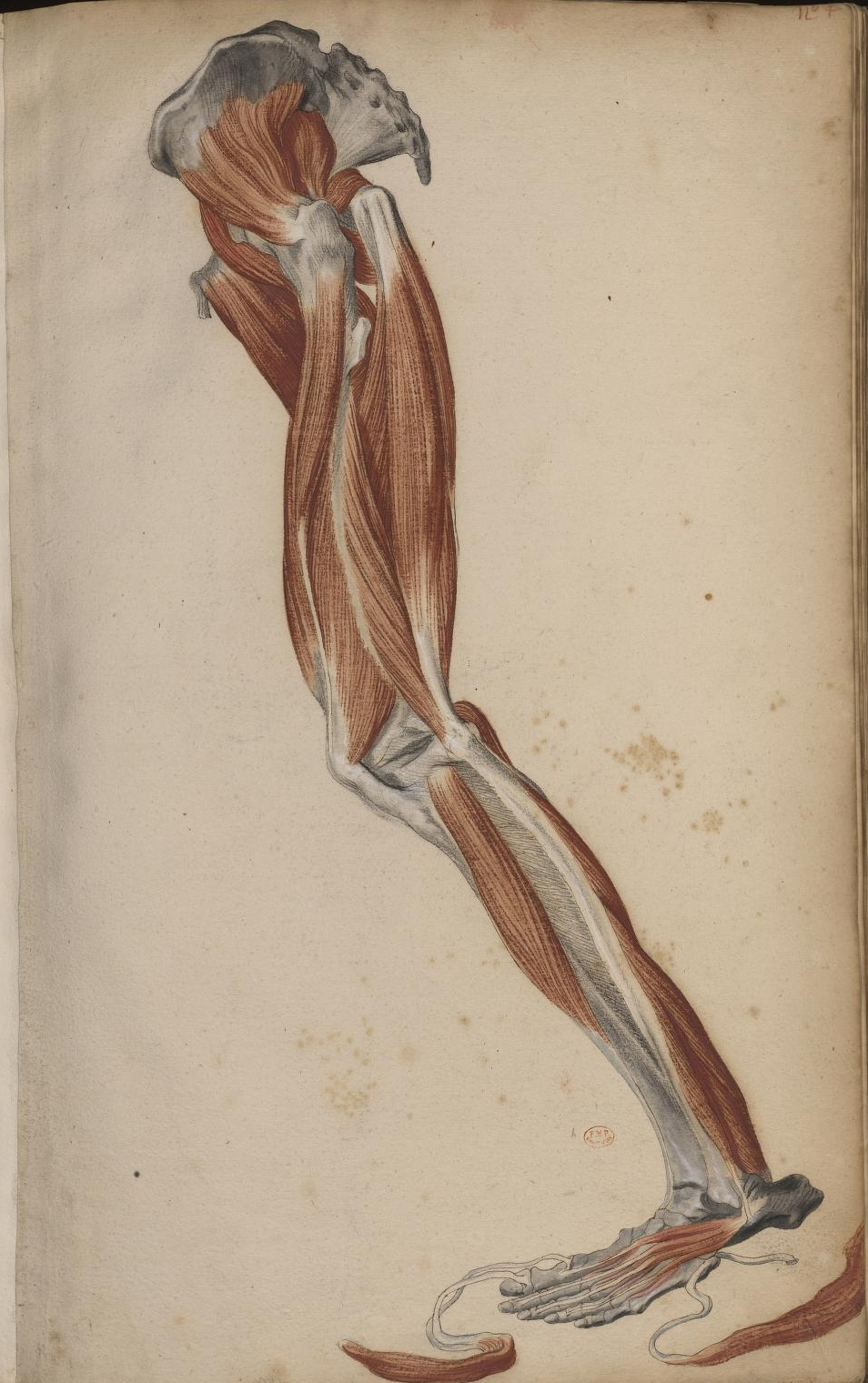
Muscles of the leg
