= Lords of Robecque =

Members of the feudal Belgian nobility

the Lords of Robecque, (Robecq) belonged to the Feudal Belgian nobility, Robecque is in Artois, now France. It became a princely title in 1630.

== List of lords of Robecque ==
Antoinette the Saveuse, Dame of Robecq;
married to Charles of Hallewyn.

  1. Margereth of Halewyn, Lady of Robecq;
    married to Louis of Yves.
    1. Jacqueline of Yves, Lady of Robecq;
      Married to John IV of Saint-Omer

=== House of Saint-Omer ===
John IV of Saint-Omer;
married to Jacqueline of Yves, lady of Robecque.

  1. Louis of Saint-Omer, Lord of Robecque.
    1. Robert of Saint-Omer, 1st Baron of Robecque; died 1617; without heirs.
      1. John V of Saint-Omer, 2nd Baron of Robecque

=== House of Montmorency ===
Louis of Montmorency, Lord of Beuvry killed in 1585 Ostend.
married to Jeanne de Saint-Omer, Lady of Robecque.

  1. François of Montmorency, 4th Baron of Robecque.
  2. Jean of Montmorency, 1st Prince of Robecque; died 1631, Knight of the Golden Fleece.
    married to Madeleine de Lens.
    1. Eugène of Montmorency, 2nd Prince of Robecque: died 1683, Knight of the Golden Fleece.
      Married to Marguerite of Arenberg.
      1. Philippe of Montmorency, 3rd Prince of Robecque: died 1691
        married to Philippine of Croy.
        1. Charles of Montmorency, 4th Prince of Robecque:
          married to Isabelle of Croy. No heirs.
        2. Anne I Auguste of Montmorency, 5th prince of Robecque;
          married to Catherine du Bellay.
          1. Anne II Louis of Montmorency, 6th prince of Robecque
            1. Anne III Louis of Montmorency, 7th prince of Robecque
              1. Gaston of Montmorency, 8th prince of Robecque
                1. Anne Charlotte of Montmorency;
                  married to Emmanuel de Cossé, Count of Brissac

=== House of Cosse Brissac ===
Emmanuel de Cossé-Brissac, prince of Robecque (1793–1870),

  1. Henri de Cossé-Brissac, Prince of Robecque (1822–1887)
    1. Louis-Henri de Cossé-Brissac, Prince of Robecque (1852–1925),
      1. Marie-Jeanne de Cossé-Brissac (1884–1951);
        married to Guy de Lévis-Mirepoix (1879–1940)
        1. Emmanuel de Lévis-Mirepoix, Prince of Robecque (1909–1951)
          1. Guy-Emmanuel de Lévis-Mirepoix, Prince of Robecque(* 1947)
