= Wenzel, 1st Prince Paar =

High Born Wenzel 1st Prince Paar
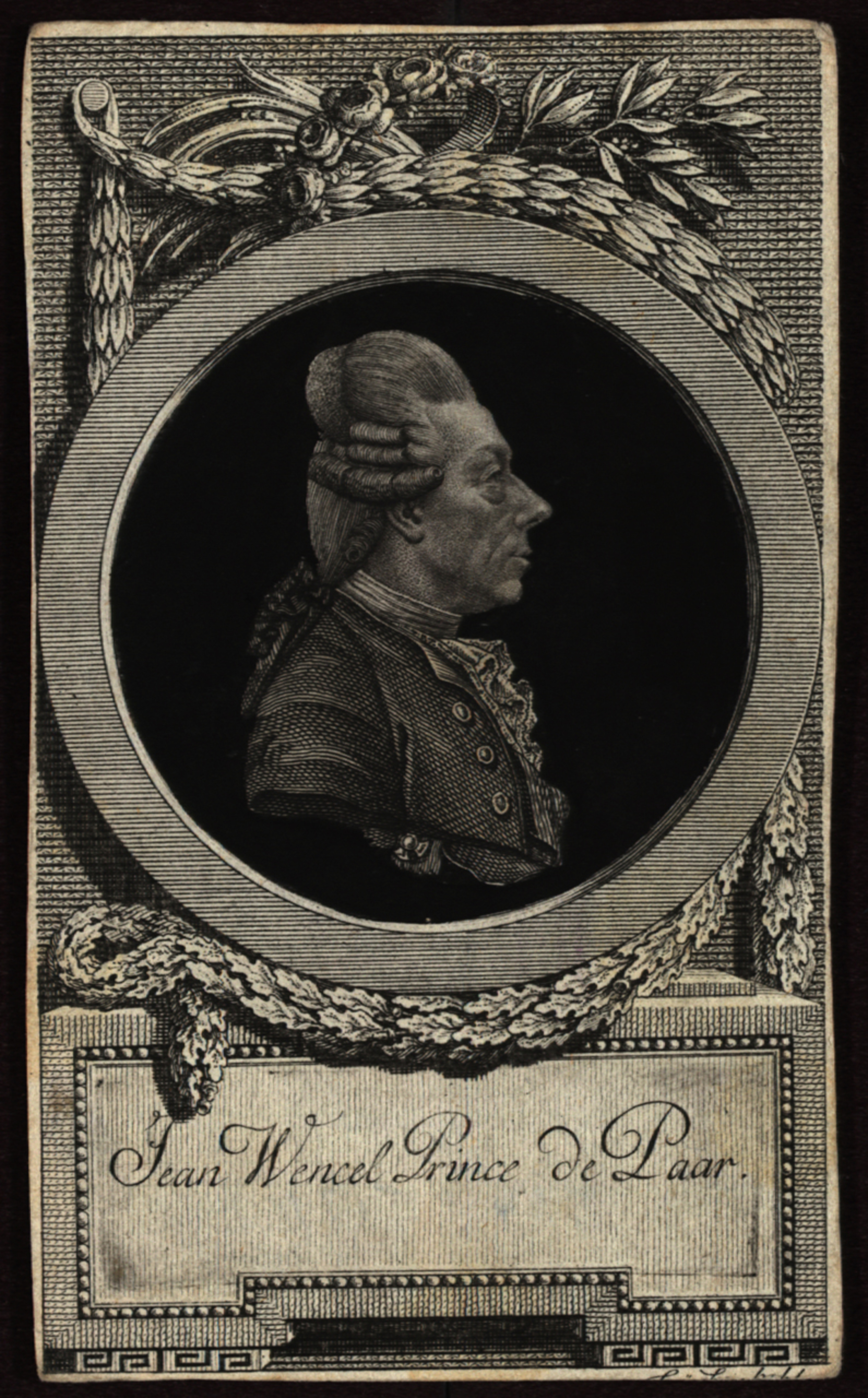
- Born: Wenzel Johann Joseph Paar; 7 August 1719; Vienna, Archduchy of Austria
- Died: 5 July 1792 (aged 72); Vienna, Archduchy of Austria
- Noble family: Paar
- Spouse: Maria Antonia Esterházy de Galántha (m. 1743; died 1771)
- Issue: Wenzel Franz Anton Paar; Maria Theresia Paar
- Father: Johann Leopold Paar
- Mother: Marie Terezie Violanta von Sternberg

Wenzel Johann Joseph, 1st Prince Paar (7 August 1719 – 7 July 1792) was an Austrian aristocrat who served as Chamberlain and Supreme Imperial, Court and General Hereditary Postmaster.

== Early life ==
Paar was born on 7 August 1719 in Vienna, Archduchy of Austria. He was the son of Count Johann Leopold Paar (1693–1741) and Countess Marie Theresia Violanta von Sternberg (1699–1761). Through his parents' marriage, the Paar family inherited large estates in Bohemia, including the allodial lordship of Bechin and the adjoining allodial estate of Draschitz, where they spent most of their time.

His paternal grandparents were Count Karl Joseph Paar and Countess Maria Renata von Sternberg. His paternal grandparents were Johann Joseph von Sternberg and Marie Violanta Theresia von Preysing.

== Career ==
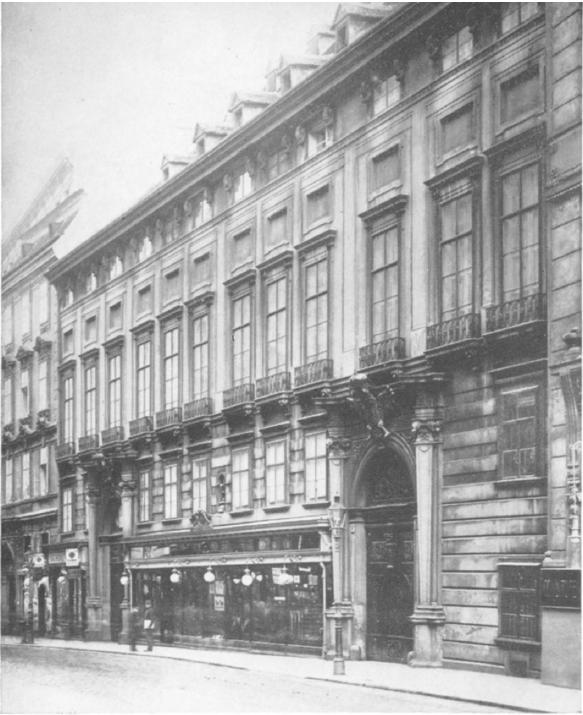
The Palais Paar on Wollzeile in Vienna

Paar was a Real Privy Councillor and Chamberlain, Supreme Imperial Court and General Postmaster. Since the 16th century, they owned the Palais Paar on Wollzeile in Vienna (which was sold in 1931). In 1761 he bought the Újezd estate from Jozsef Malovec of Malovice.

On 1 August 1769 in Vienna, Count Paar was granted Bohemian princely status (primogeniture), who was also elevated to the status of Imperial Prince on 5 August 1769 with the title "High Born" and at the same time received the Grand Palatine. However, there was no introduction to the Imperial Council of Princes, as the Prince did not possess any immediate Imperial territory, which is why the Federal Diet resolution of 18 August 1825, which included the official recognition of the elevations of the mediatized princes before August 1806, was not applied to his heirs. As one of 16 non-mediatized princely families, the family did at least hold a hereditary seat in the House of Lords, the Upper House of the Austrian Imperial Council, since 18 April 1861.

With his wife, he held important positions at Court; they accompanied Marie Antoinette (daughter of Emperor Francis I and Empress Maria Theresa) to France for her marriage to the Dauphin of France, the future King Louis XVI.

A friend of and patron of Wolfgang Amadeus Mozart, as early as 1762, he invited the young Mozart to his palace in Vienna. When Mozart moved to Vienna permanently in 1784, Paar attended his famous concerts and their correspondence has been preserved from that time. In 1786, a number of Mozart's friends from Bohemia, including the famous singer Josepha Duschek, gave a concert at the Paar Palace in Vienna.

== Personal life ==
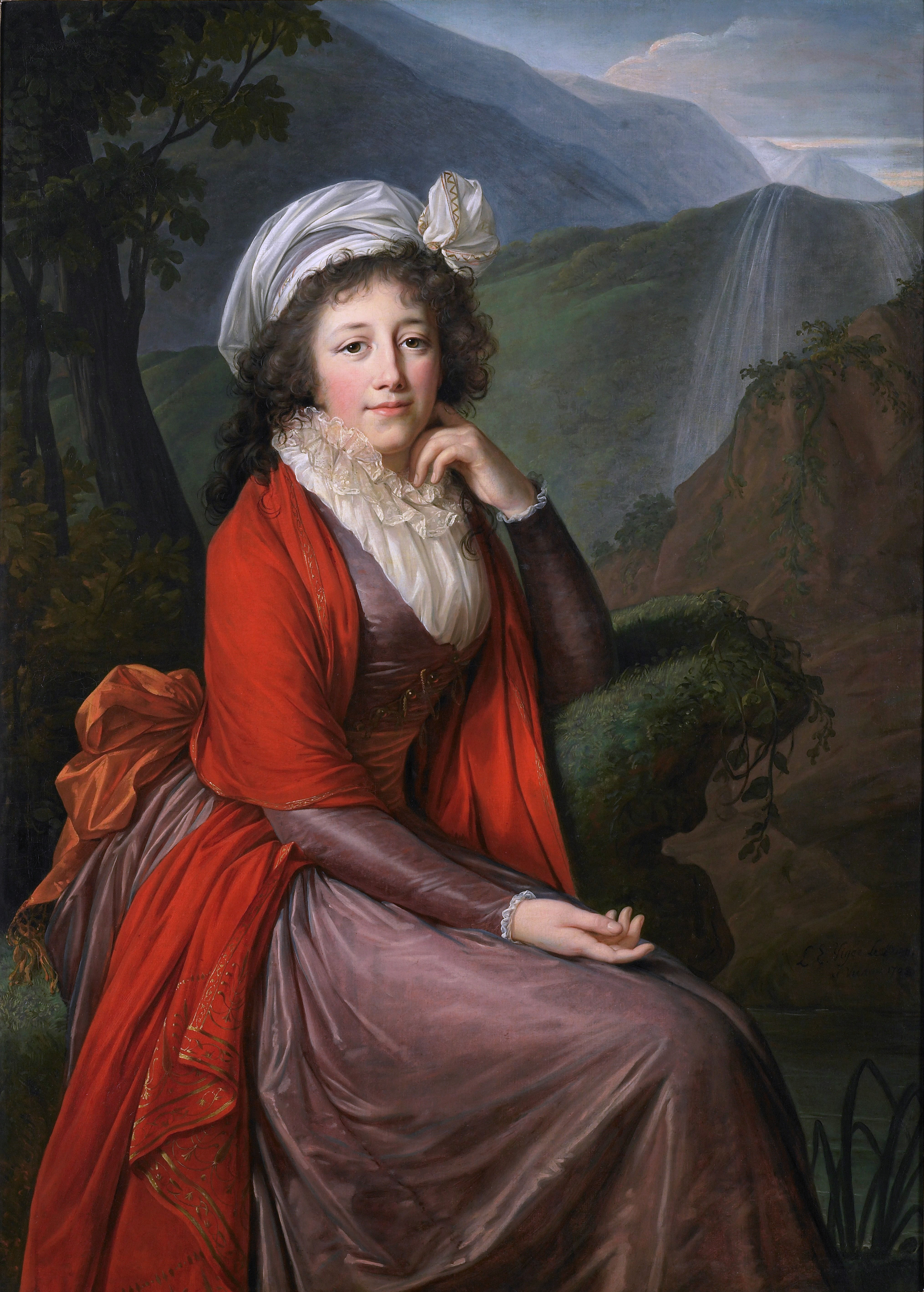
Portrait of his daughter, Countess Maria Theresia, by Élisabeth Vigée Le Brun, 1793

In 1743, Paar was married to Maria Antonia Esterházy de Galántha (1719–1771), a daughter of Count Ferenc Esterházy and Countess Maria Szidónia Pálffy ab Erdöd (a daughter of Count János V Pálffy ab Erdöd, the Ban of Croatia and Palatine of the Kingdom of Hungary). Together, they were the parents of:

- Wenzel Franz Anton, 2nd Prince Paar (1744–1812), who married Princess Maria Antonia of Liechtenstein, a daughter of Johann Nepomuk Karl, Prince of Liechtenstein and Countess Maria Josepha von Harrach-Rohrau (a daughter of Count Friedrich August von Harrach-Rohrau).
- Countess Maria Theresia Paar (1746–1818), who married Johann Nepomuk Josef de Longueval, Count of Bucquoy, a son of Franz Leopold de Longueval, Count of Bucquoy, and Gabriela Johanna Hermine von Rogendorf.

Prince Paar died on 7 July 1792 in Vienna. In 1793, his son acquired Kardašova Řečice and Pluhův Žďár, which had to be sold to Foreign Minister and, later, President Edvard Beneš in 1928 as part of the land reform. The remaining properties in Bohemia were lost through expropriation after World War II.

=== Descendants ===
Through his son Wenzel, he was a grandfather of Major General Karl, 3rd Prince Paar (1773–1819), who married Countess Guidobaldine Cavriani (the daughter of Count Ludwig Franz Cavriani and Johanna Terezie of Kolowrat-Novohradský), Countess Antonia Maria Paar (second wife of Karl Joseph, 1st Prince of Salm-Reifferscheidt-Raitz), Count Wenzel Paar, Count Josef Paar; Countess Maria Theresia Henriette Paar (wife of Count François Joseph de Mercy d'Argenteau), Count Johann Baptist Paar, a Colonel in the Austrian Army, Count Lajos Paar, a Major in the Austrian Army (who married Countess Maria Henriette von Schallenberg, and Mária Paulina Andrássy de Csíkszentkirály), and Count Niklas Franz Paar, a Knight of Malta.

Through his daughter Maria Theresia, he was a grandfather of Georg Franz August de Longueval, Count of Buquoy (1781–1851), the prominent mathematician, and inventor who was a close friend of Johann Wolfgang von Goethe.
