= Paar (surname) =

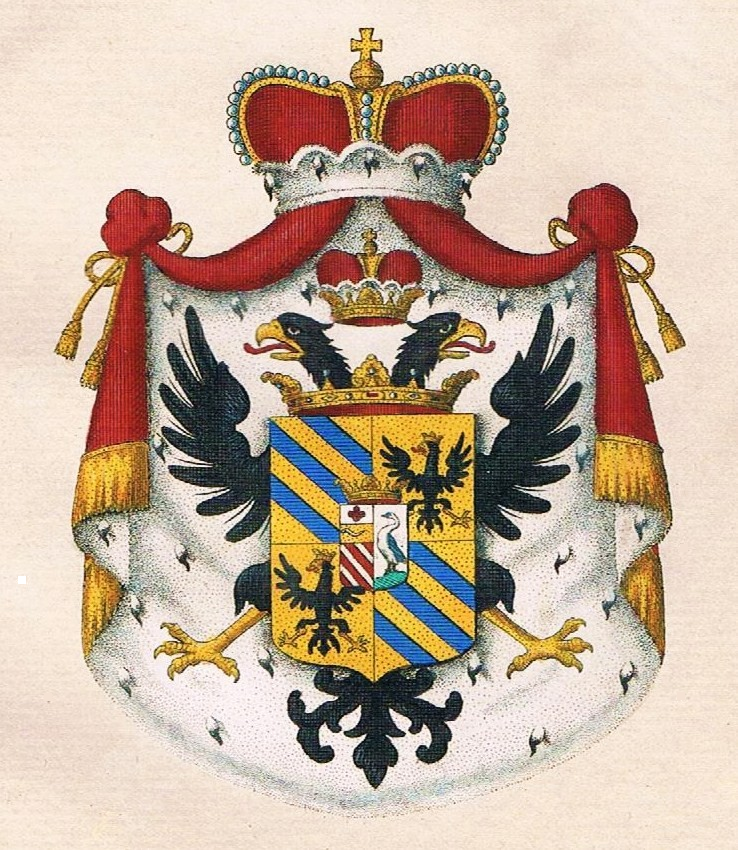
Coat of arms of Princes von Paar

Paar is a surname and also the name of an old Austrian noble family, the Paar family.

== Notable people ==
- Howard Paar, British music supervisor
- Jack Paar (1918–2004), American radio and television talk show host
- Johann Christoph von Paar (died 1636), Austrian noble
- Karel Paar (born 1945), Czech cyclist
- Karel Eduard Paar (born 1934), Czech knight of the Sovereign Military Order of Malta
- Ludwig von Paar (1817–1893), Austrian diplomat and art collector
- Margit Paar, West German-German luger
- Vladimir Paar (born 1942), Croatian physicist

== See also ==
- Kurt Van De Paar (born 1978), Belgian footballer
