= Paar =

Paar may refer to:

- Paar (river), a tributary to the Danube in Germany
- Paar (surname), includes a list of people with the name
- Paar (film), a 1984 Indian Hindi-language film
- PAAR, or Pittsburgh Action Against Rape, an organization devoted to issues of sexual violence

== See also ==
- Par (disambiguation)
- Parr (disambiguation)
- Paara (film), a 1985 Indian film
