= Paar family =

Austrian noble family

Paar
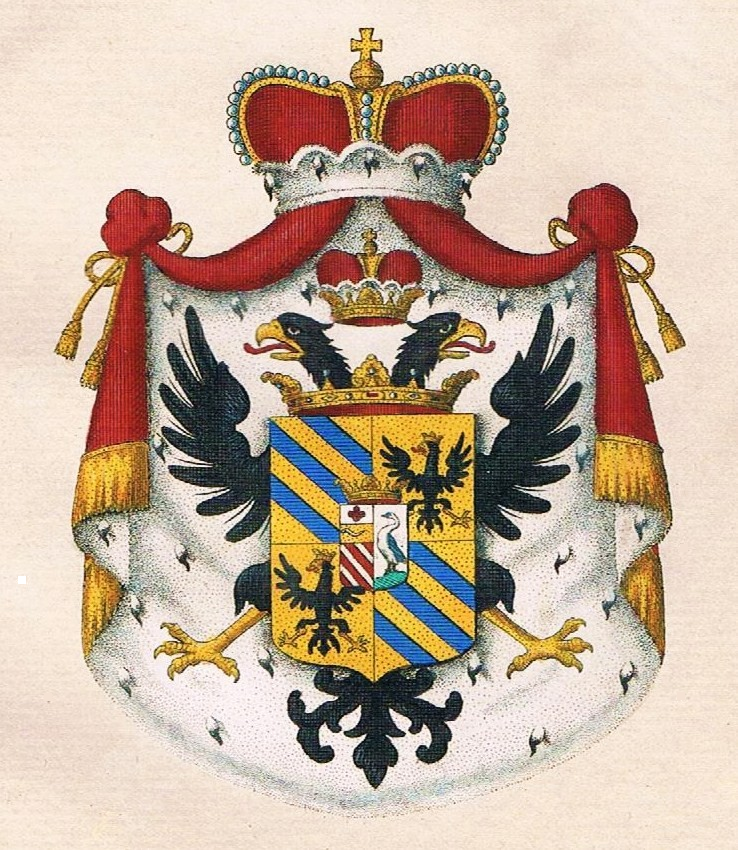
- Coat of arms of the Princes Paar von Hartberg und Krottenstein (1831)
- Country: Austria, Bohemia
- Founded: 1450
- Founder: Zeno Scurino
- Current head: Hubertus, 8th Prince Paar
- Titles: Prince Paar; Count Paar; Baron Paar
- Connected families: Liechtenstein

The House of Paar is an Austrian princely family that has been prominent within the Holy Roman Empire since the 16th century. They owned considerable properties in the Austro-Hungarian Empire and the Kingdom of Bohemia.

== History ==
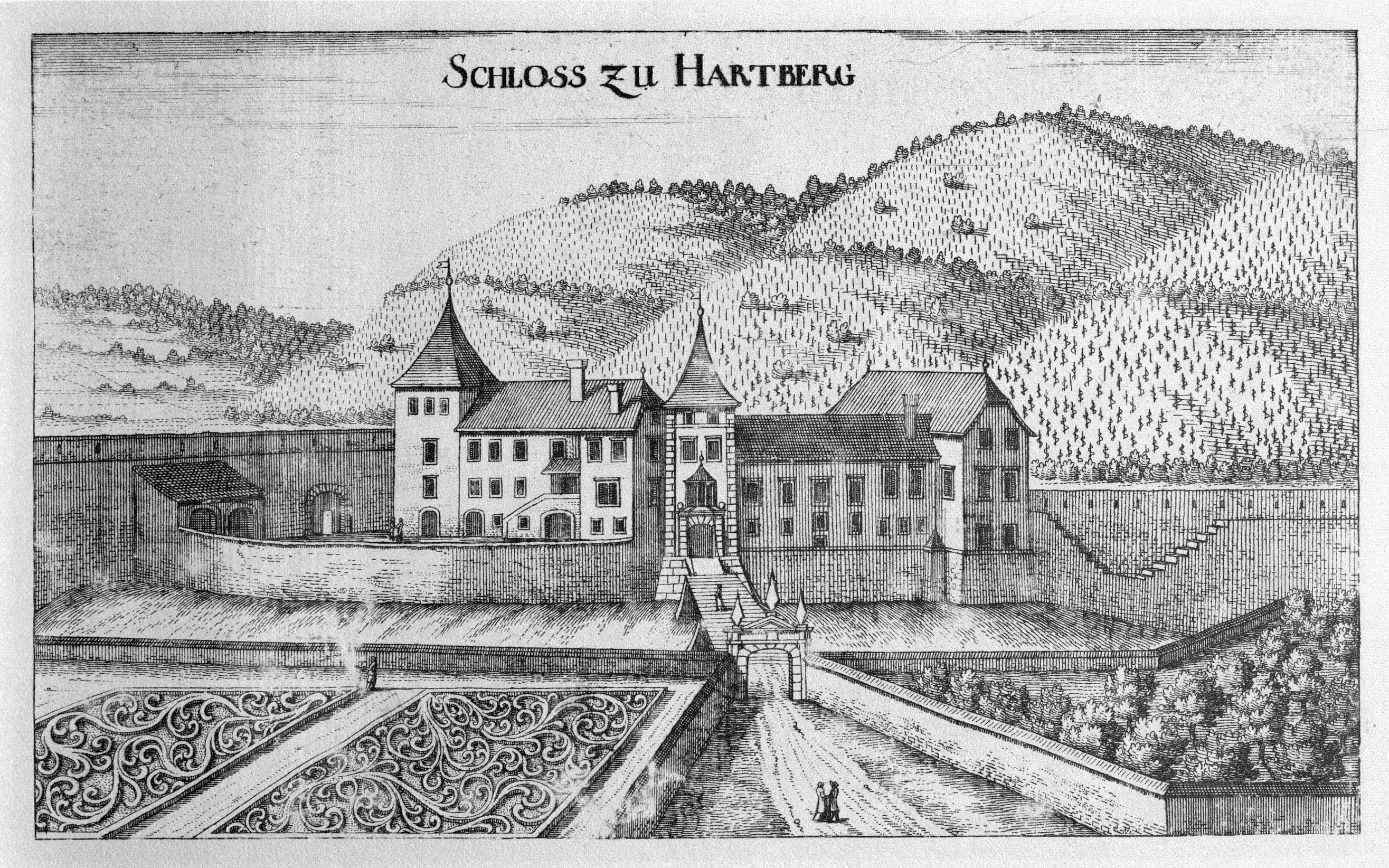
Schloss Paar in Hartberg, Styria (1681)

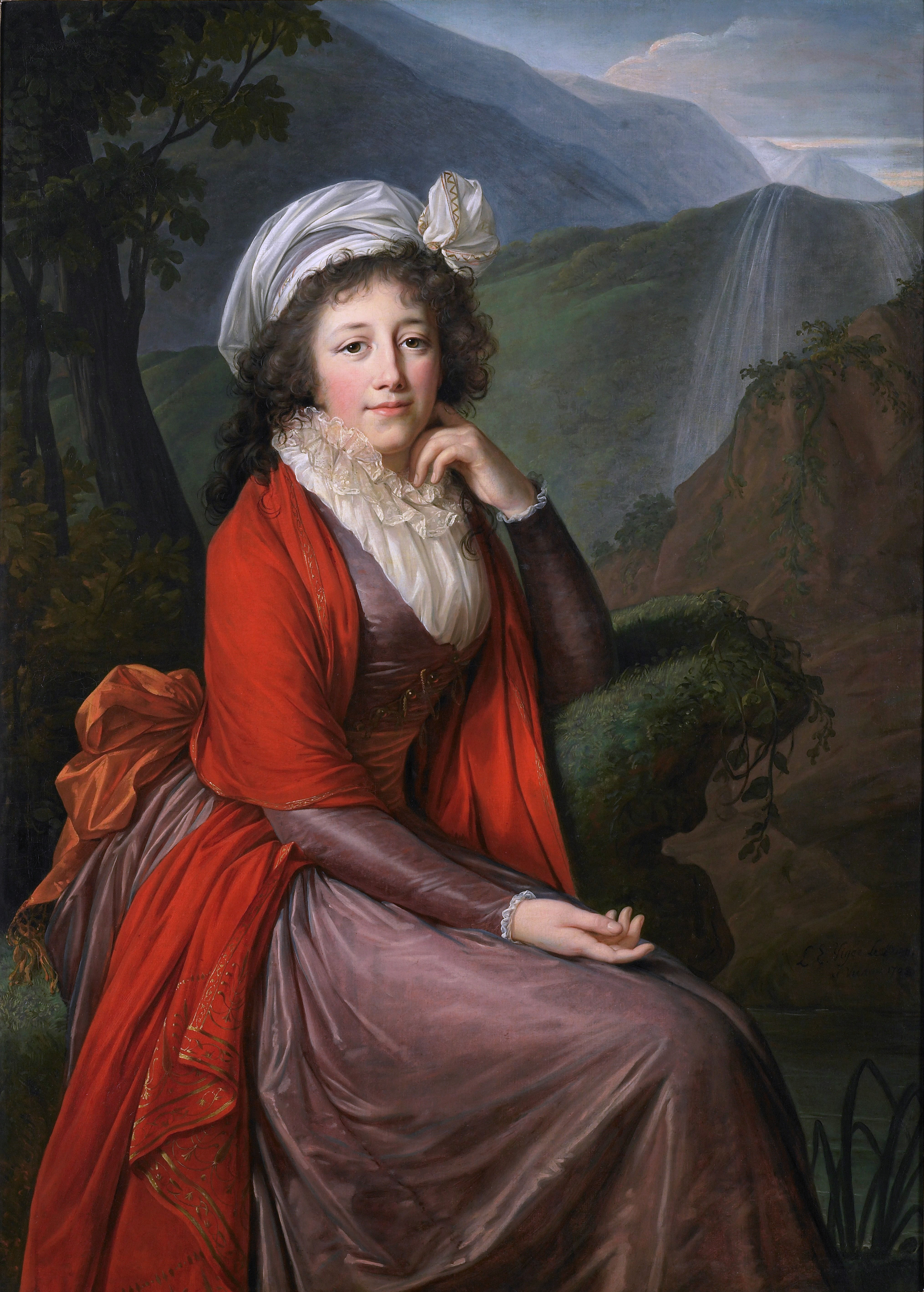
Portrait of Countess Maria Theresia Paar, daughter of Wenzel, 1st Prince Paar, by Élisabeth Vigée Le Brun, 1793

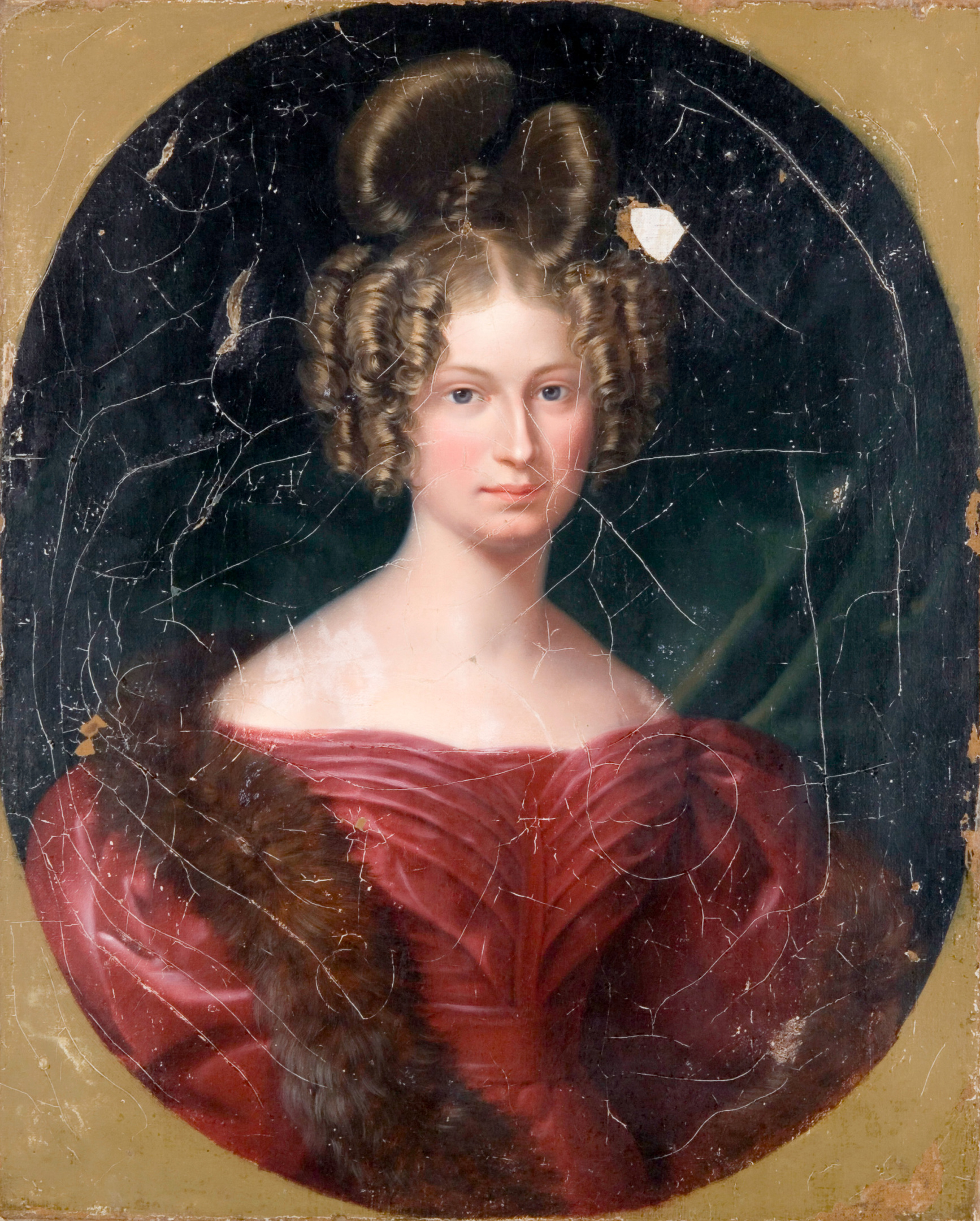
Princess Ida Paar von Hartberg und Krottenstein (formerly Princess of Liechtenstein), wife of the 4th Prince Paar von Hartberg und Krottenstein, painted by Joseph Karl Stieler, c. 1830

The family likely originated in Italy and was first documented in 1450 with Zeno Scurino, known as Paar; later they entered the service of the Habsburgs. In 1560, Peter Joseph Paar, Chief Postmaster in Bratislava, was granted Hungarian nobility and on 5 February 1574, he was Knighted as an Imperial nobleman. Johann Baptist von Paar was appointed Postmaster for Inner Austria by Charles II, Archduke of Austria. In 1571, he acquired Schloss Paar in Hartberg, Styria. His son, Johann Christoph, bought the Krottenhof in Graz in 1590.

On 21 January 1606, the brothers and cousins Rudolf, Julius, Johann Friedrich, Johann Christoph and Vespasian von Paar zu Hardtperg were elevated to the rank of Imperial Barons.

In 1636, Johann Christoph von Paar received confirmation of his elevation to the rank of Imperial Count, but died that same year. It wasn't until 21 October 1652, that his second successor, Karl, actually received the title of Count. Over time, the Barons von Paar became landowners in Bohemia. On 6 March 1652, they were granted the Bohemian Inkolat. Confirmation of their Bohemian Countship followed on 14 January 1654, and the unification of the coats of arms with the extinct Schwanberg and Rosenberg took place on 28 November 1665.

The Bohemian princely status (primogeniture) was granted in Vienna on 1 August 1769 to the actual Privy Councillor and Chamberlain, Supreme Imperial Court and General Postmaster Count Wenzel Johann Joseph von Paar, who was also elevated to the status of Imperial Prince on 5 August 1769 with the title "High Born" and at the same time received the Grand Palatine. However, there was no introduction to the Imperial Council of Princes, as the Prince did not possess any immediate Imperial territory, which is why the Federal Diet resolution of 18 August 1825, which included the official recognition of the elevations of the mediatized princes before August 1806, was not applied to the Paar. As one of 16 non-mediatized princely families, the family did at least hold a hereditary seat in the House of Lords, the Upper House of the Austrian Imperial Council, since 18 April 1861.

Karl, 5th Prince Paar of Hartberg and Krottenstein (Paar von Hartberg und Krottenstein), was therefore only given the title "Serene Highness" in Ischl on 20 July 1905. Those born later bear the title and name "Graf von Paar" and "Gräfin von Paar" respectively. Alois von Paar was an Austrian Lieutenant Field Marshal, and Eduard von Paar was the commander of the Imperial and Royal Bohemian Dragoon Regiment "Graf Paar" No. 2, which was named after him, and was the long-time Adjutant General to Emperor Franz Joseph I.

== Notable members ==
=== Princes Paar (1769) ===
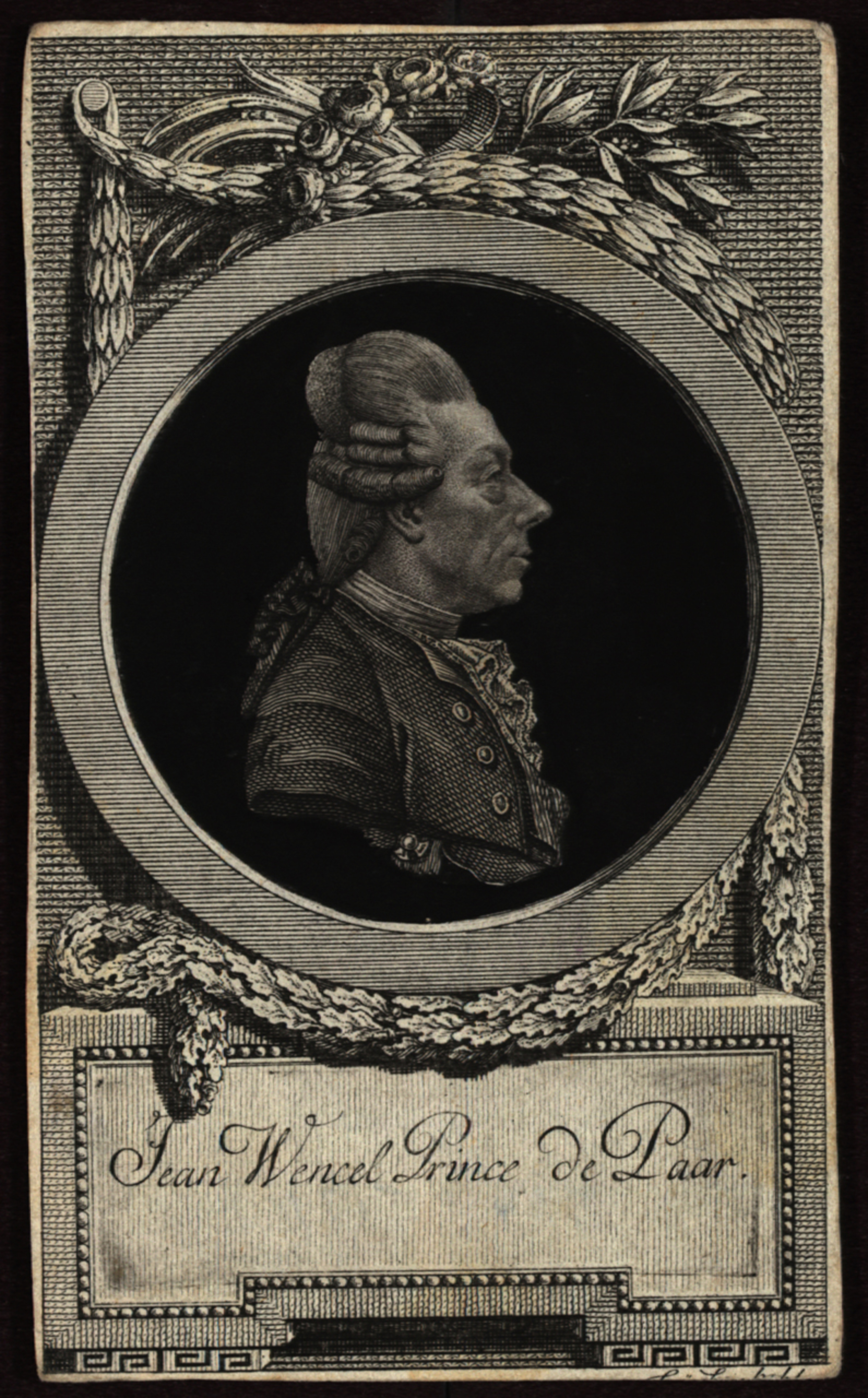
Copper engraving print of Wenzel, 1st Prince Paar, c. 1783

- 1769–1792: Wenzel Johann Joseph von Paar (1719–1792), Chamberlain and Supreme Imperial, Court and General Hereditary Postmaster
- 1792–1812: Wenzel Franz Anton von Paar (1744–1812)
- 1812–1819: Karl Joseph Anton von Paar (1772–1819), Austrian major general
- 1819–1881: Karl Wenzel Ludwig von Paar (1806–1881)
- 1881–1917: Karl Johann Wenzel von Paar (1834–1917)
- 1917–1979: Alfons Maria Ernst von Paar (1903–1979)
- 1979–2016: Alfons Wenzel Maria Wilhelm von Paar von Paar (1932–2016)
- 2016–Present: Hubertus von Paar (b. 1971)

=== Other members ===
- Rudolf von Paar (d. 1640), Baron, Commander of the Croatian Military Border
- Johann Baptist von Paar (16th century), Austrian postmaster
- Johann Christoph von Paar (d. 1636), Austrian imperial councilor
- Johann von Paar (1780–1839), Imperial and Royal Colonel, Knight of the Military Order of Maria Theresa
- Karel Eduard Paar (b. 1934), Grand Prior Emeritus of Bohemia of the Sovereign Military Order of Malta.
- Karl Joseph von Paar (1654–1725), numismatist
- Ludwig von Paar (1817–1893), Austrian diplomat and art collector
- Eduard von Paar (1837–1919), Austrian Lieutenant Field Marshal
- Alois von Paar (1840–1909), Austrian Lieutenant Field Marshal

== Estates ==
In 1571, Johann Christoph von Paar acquired Schloss Paar in Hartberg, Styria, which remained in the family's possession for several centuries and was only sold in 1981. Since the 16th century, they owned the Palais Paar on Wollzeile in Vienna, which was sold in 1931.

Through the marriage of Count Johann Leopold Paar to Countess Marie Theresia Violanta von Sternberg (1699–1761), the Paar family inherited large estates in Bohemia, including the allodial lordship of Bechin and the adjoining allodial estate of Draschitz, where they spent most of their time. In 1793, they acquired Kardašova Řečice and Pluhův Žďár, which had to be sold to Foreign Minister and, later, President Edvard Beneš in 1928 as part of the land reform. The remaining properties in Bohemia were lost through expropriation after World War II.

The Counts Paar also owned a villa in Traunkirchen.

Estates

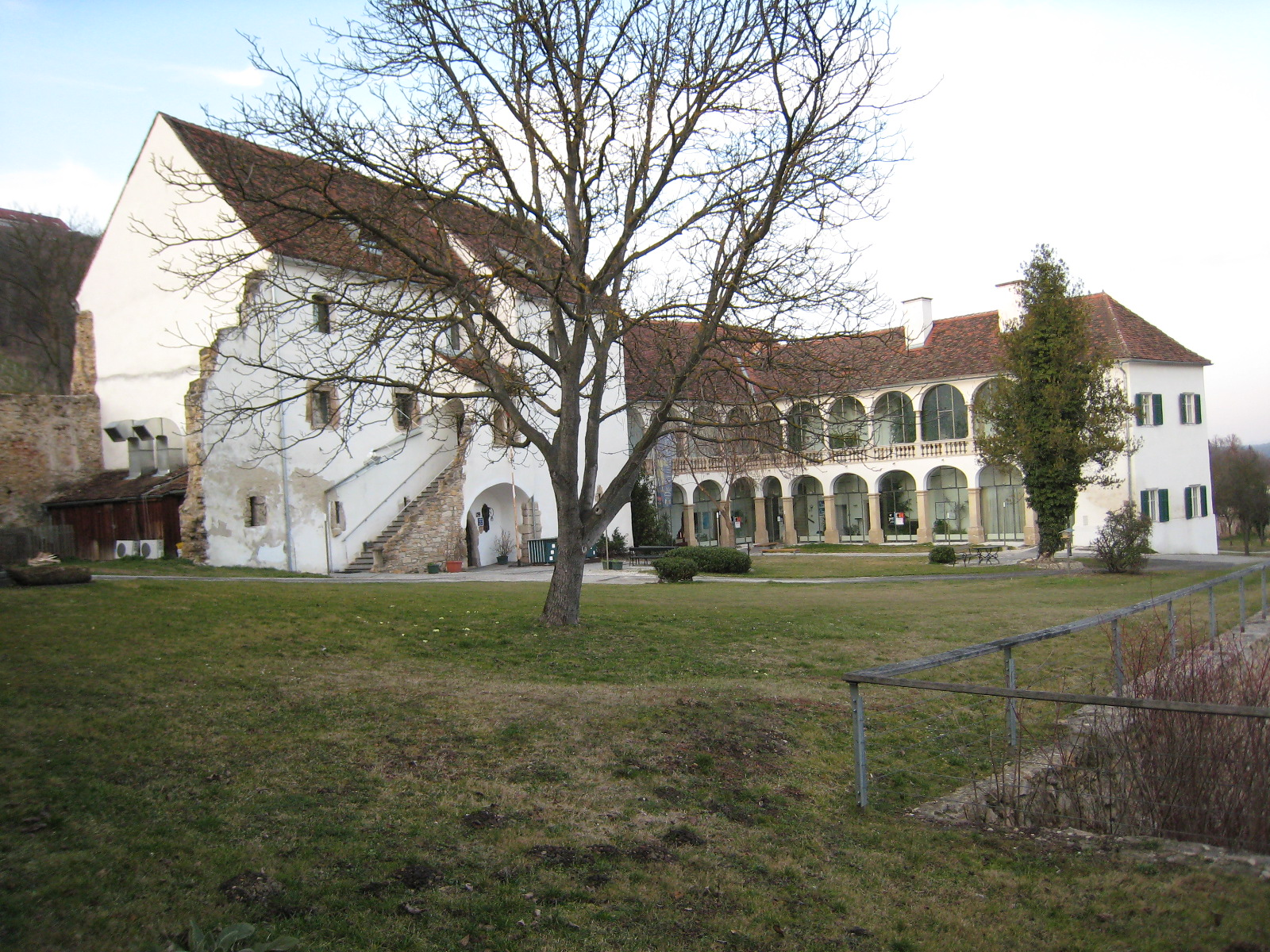
Schloss Paar, Hartberg, Styria

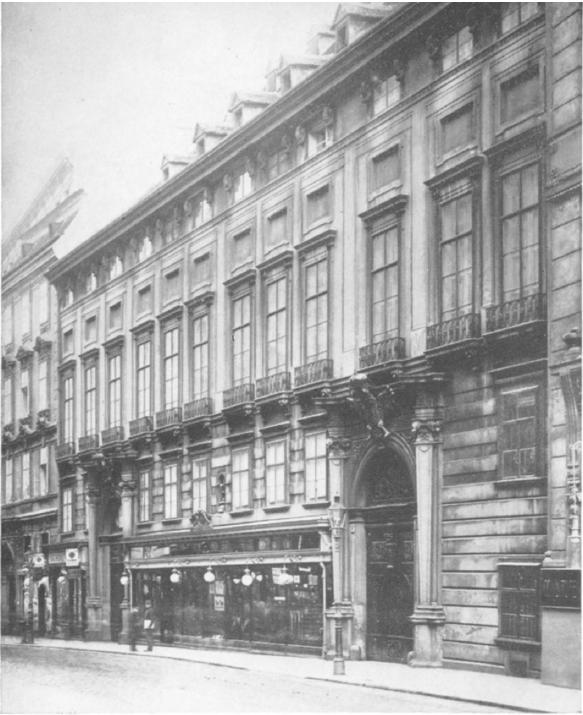
Palais Paar, Vienna

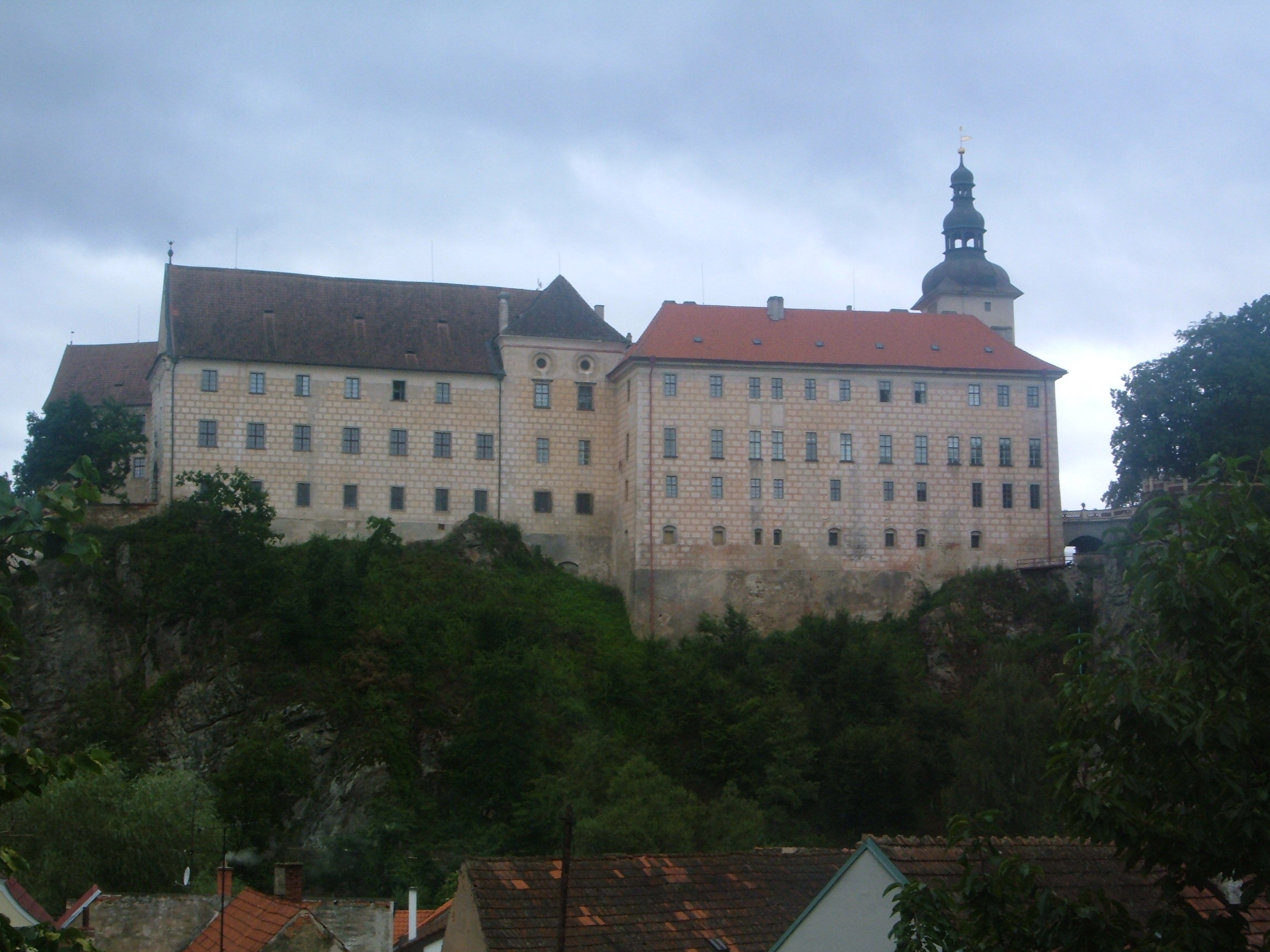
Bechyně Castle, Bohemia

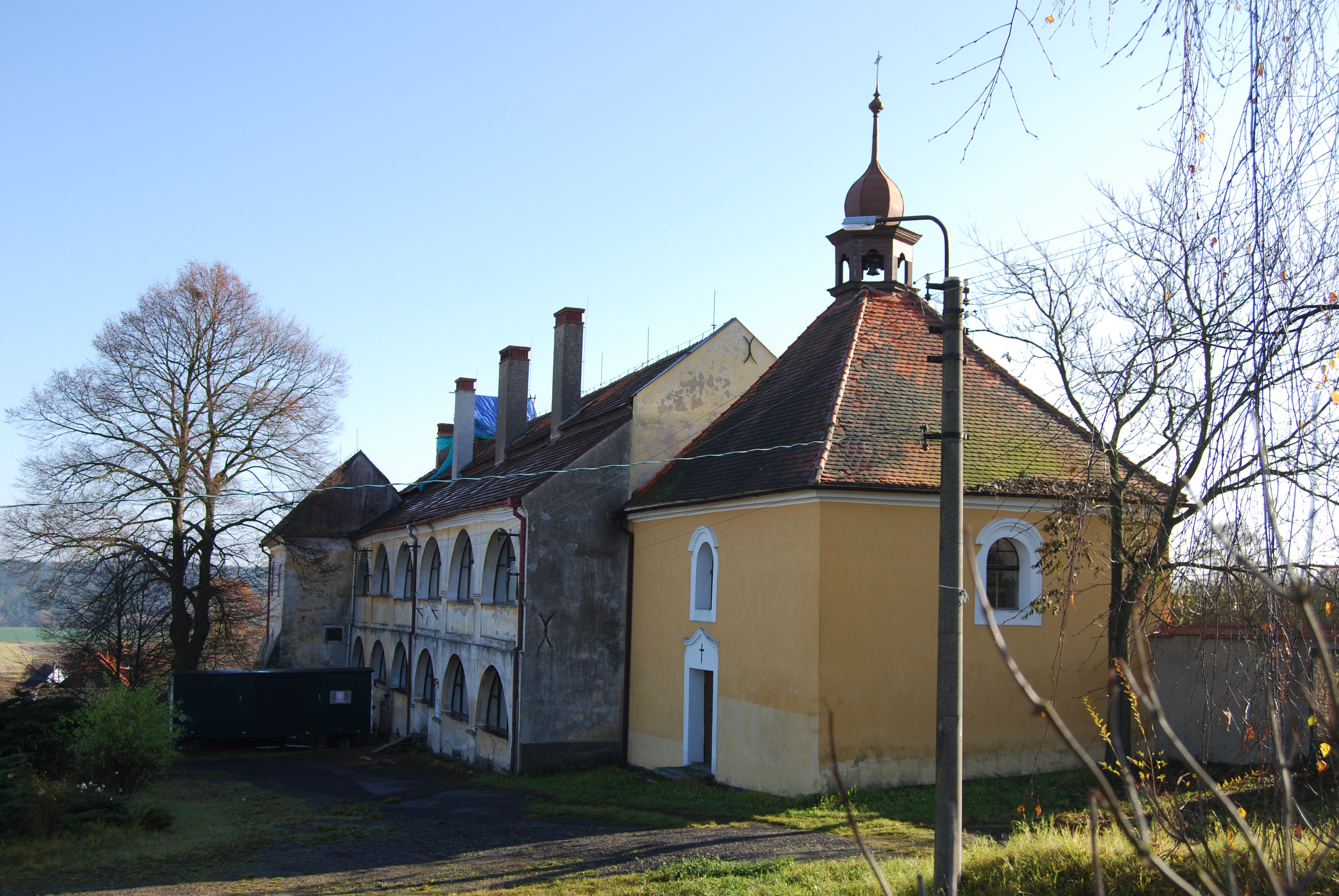
Dražíč Castle, Bohemia

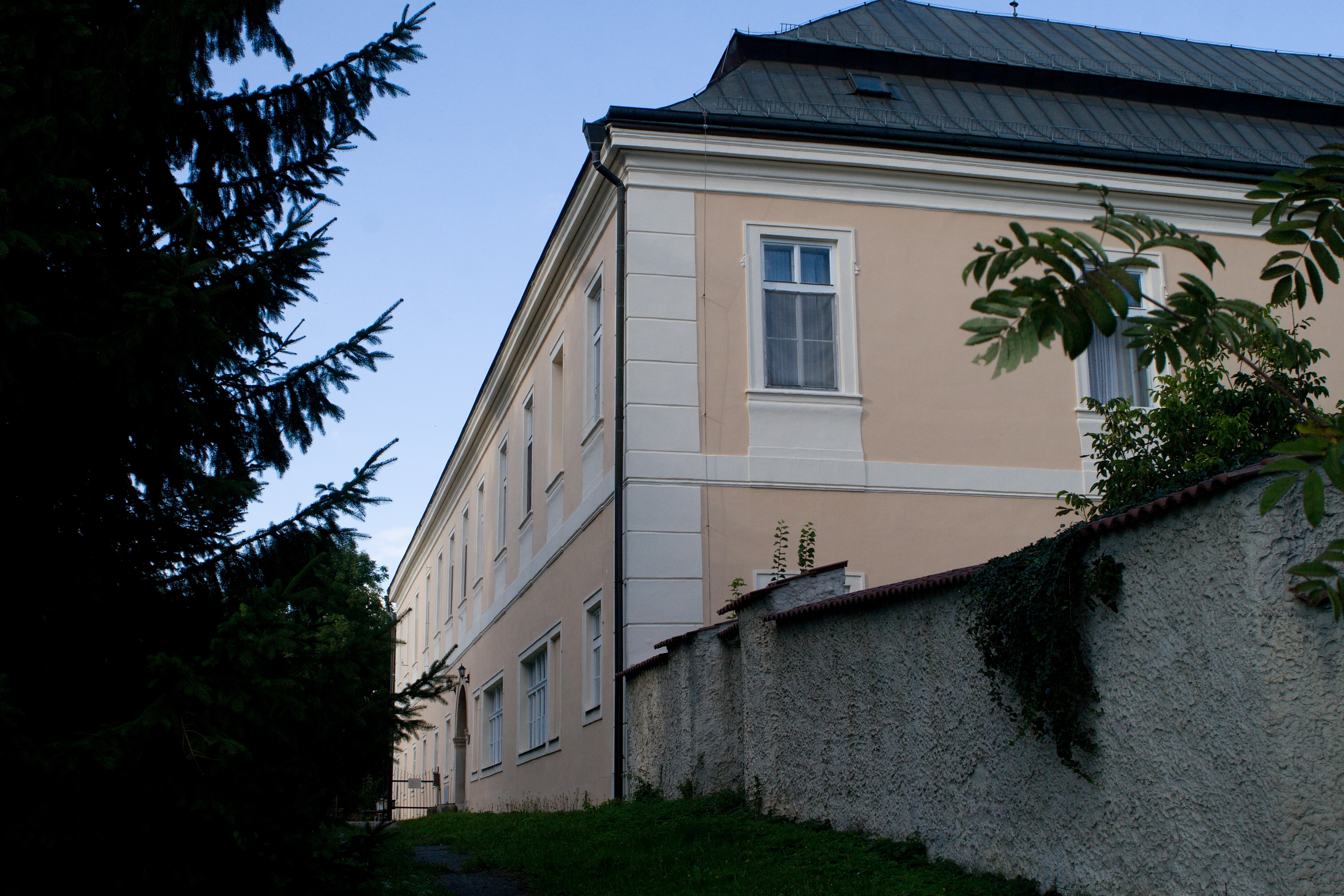
Kardašova Řečice Castle, Bohemia

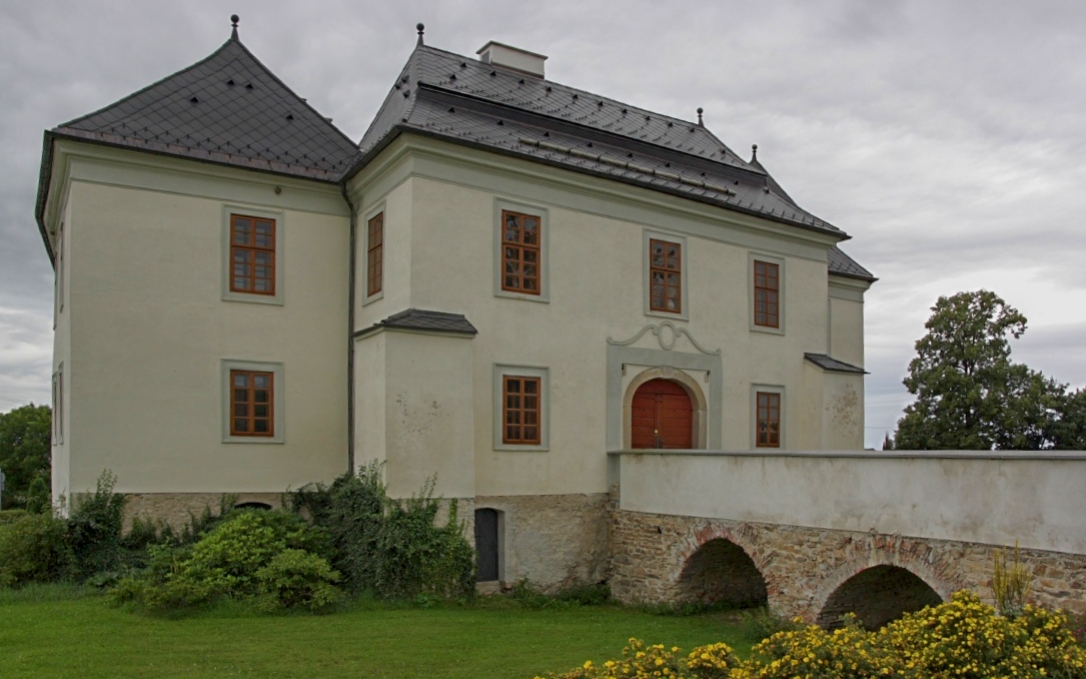
Pluhův Žďár Castle, Bohemia

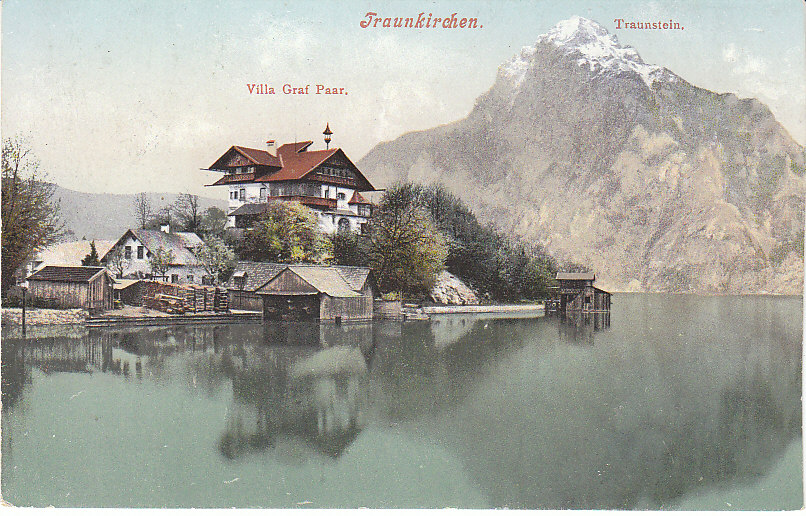
Villa of the Counts Paar in Traunkirchen (c. 1906)
