= Jiří Buquoy =

Philosopher

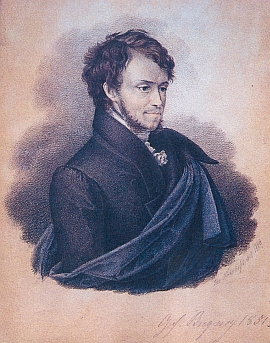
Jiří Buquoy portrait

Georg Franz August de Longueval, Count of Bucquoy Czech pronunciation (Czech: Jiří František August Buqouy; 7 September 1781 – 9 or 19 April 1851) was a Bohemian aristocrat, mathematician, and inventor.

== Early life ==
Bucquoy was born on 7 September 1781 in Brussels. He was the son of Johann Nepomuk Josef de Longueval, Count of Bucquoy, and Countess Maria Theresia Paar (1746–1818). His brother was Louis Arnost Buquoy.

His paternal grandparents were Franz Leopold de Longueval, Count of Bucquoy, and Gabriela Johanna Hermine von Rogendorf. His maternal grandparents were Wenzel, 1st Prince Paar and Countess Maria Antonia Esterházy de Galántha (a daughter of Count Ferenc Esterházy).

== Career ==
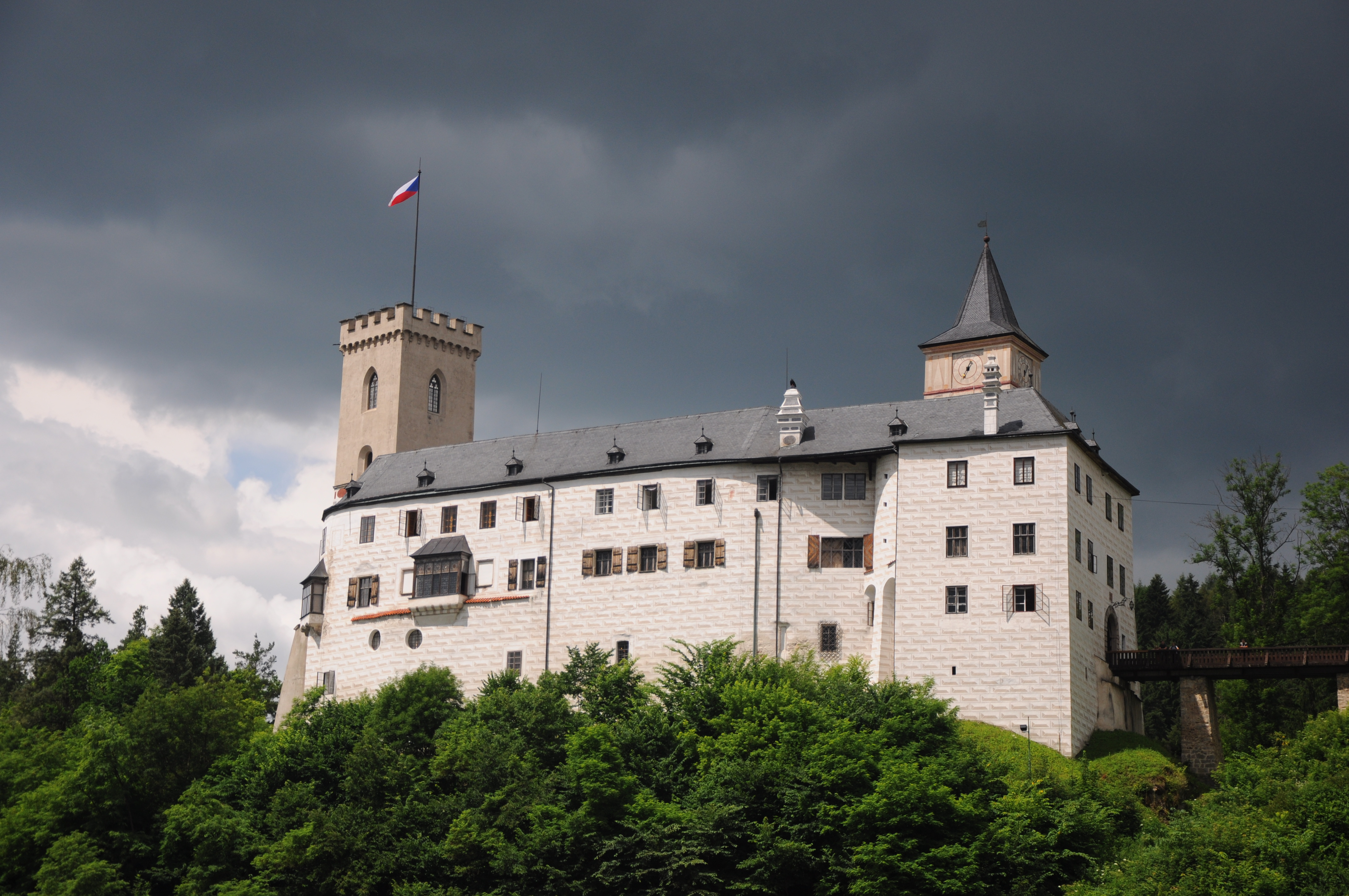
Rožmberk Castle

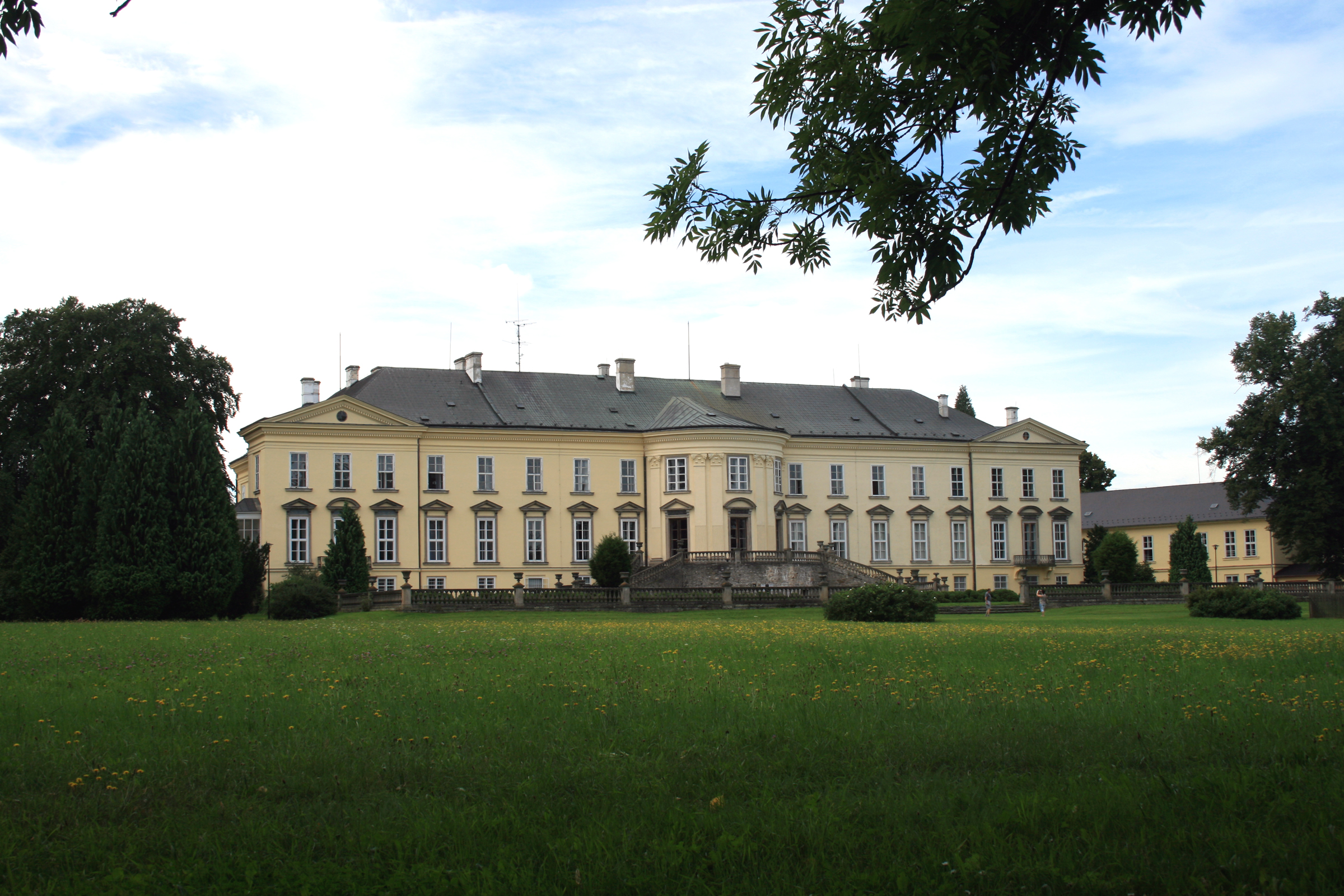
Novohrad Castle

Bucquoy studied mathematics, natural science, philosophy, and economics at the Prague and Vienna universities. In 1810 he constructed an early steam engine. Most of all, he was engaged in the glass works in Nové Hrady region. On the basis of many experiments he succeeded in inventing an original process technology of a black opaque glass called hyalite (1817), as well as completing the production process for red hyalite (1819).

He was a close friend of Johann Wolfgang von Goethe and the two exchanged many letters.

== Personal life ==
In 1806 in Vienna, he married Countess Gabriela Rottenhanová (1784–1863), later a lady-in-waiting, daughter of the Bohemian Supreme Burgrave Jindřich Rottenhan and heiress of the Červený Hrádek and Jemniště estates. Together, they had five children:

- Maria Theresa Isabela (1807–1869), who married Vincenc, Free Lord Zessner von Spitzenberg, Chamberlain and owner of the Dobříčany estate, in 1830.
- Marie Gabriela Isabela (1809–1841), who never married.
- Marie Anna Karolína (1811–1898), who married Frederick, Count Deym of Střítež, Chamberlain, member of the Frankfurt Parliament, and owner of the estates of Nemyšl, Liblice and Lojovice, in 1829.
- Maria Isabel (1812–1893), who married John Nepomuk, Count of Trauttmansdorff, Chamberlain and Regional Commissioner in Bruck, in 1839.
- George John Henry (1814–1883), Chamberlain, hereditary member of the Austrian House of Lords, owner of the estates of Nové Hrady and Rožmberk; he married Sophie Therese, Princess of Oettingen-Wallerstein, in 1847.

Bucquoy died on 9 (or 19) April 1851 in Prague.

== See also ==
- Lords of Bucquoy
