= Červená Lhota Castle =

Castle in the Czech Republic

Červená Lhota
- South Bohemian Region; Near Pluhův Žďár in the Czech Republic
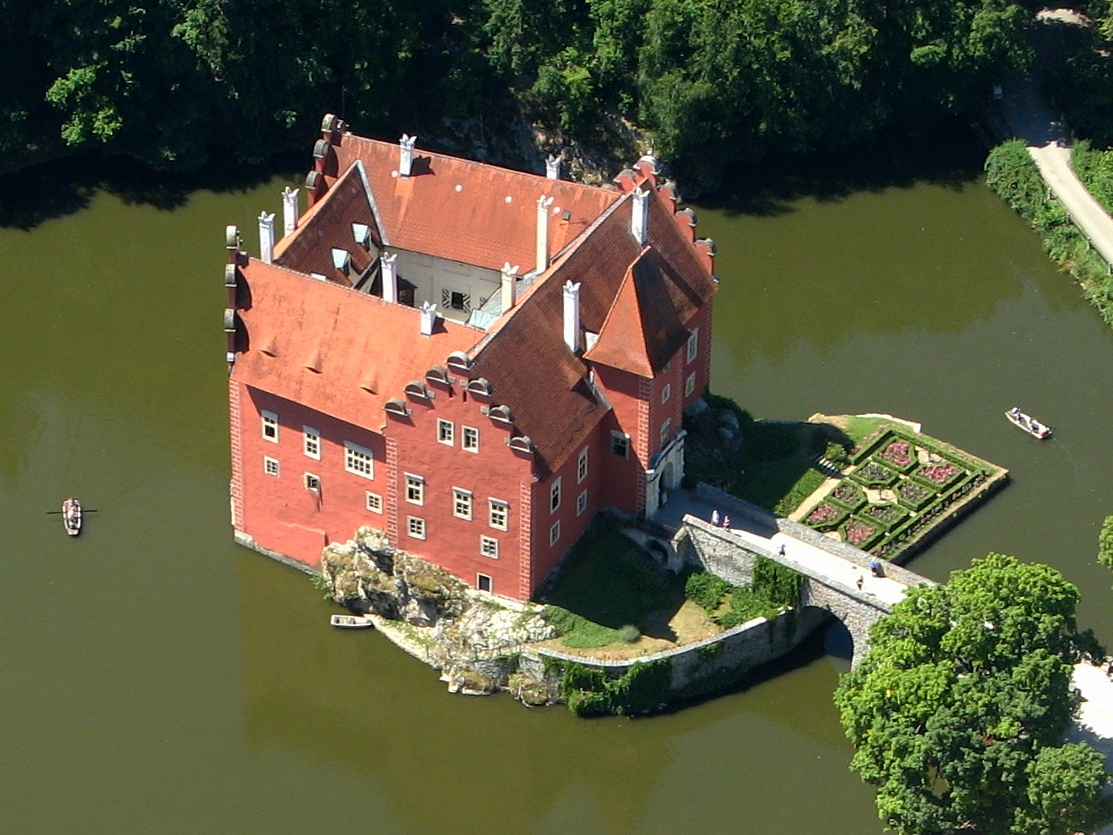
- Aerial view

Site information
- Type: Castle

Location
- Location in the Czech Republic
- Coordinates: 49°14′47.3″N 14°53′7″E

Site history
- Built: 1530

Červená Lhota (German: Roth-Lhotta) is a Renaissance castle in the South Bohemian Region, Czech Republic. It lies in the village of Červená Lhota in the Pluhův Žďár municipality, about 20 kilometres (12 mi) northwest of Jindřichův Hradec. It stands in the middle of a lake on a rocky island. There is also a park, where the Chapel of the Holy Trinity is located.

== Etymology ==
The village where the castle is located was originally called just Lhota. In the 16th century, it was called Nová Lhota ("new Lhota"). From the 17th century, it was called Nová Červená Lhota ("new red Lhota") after the castle, and then just Červená Lhota ("red lhota"). The castle's name Červená Lhota is explained by the colour of the castle's bright-red roof tiles.

== History ==
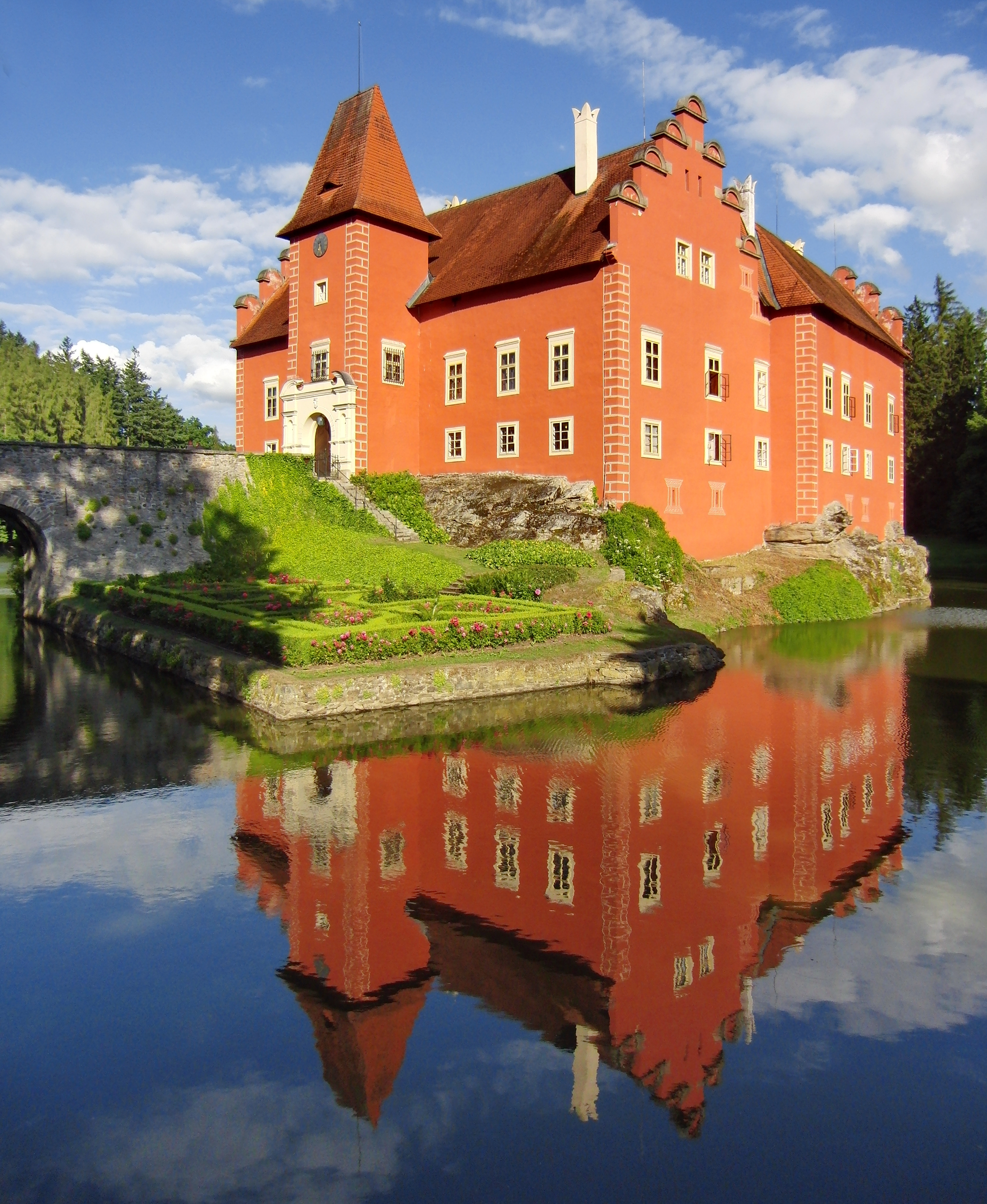
Červená Lhota

The existence of an original fortress on the site of today's castle is assumed from sometime around the middle of the 14th century. It was built on a rocky granite outcrop, which, after the damming of a stream and the filling up of a fishpond, became an island. The first written record is an entry in the land records from 1465, mentioning the division of the property of the deceased Ctibor of Zásmuk between his two sons, Petr and Václav. The fortress might then have been sold to Diviš Boubínský of Újezd, who in turn sold it to the knightly family of Káb of Rybňan sometime around 1530. The family had the original Gothic castle rebuilt and the basic Renaissance remodelling carried out between 1542 and 1555, and the castle acquired the name Nová Lhota. In 1597, it was sold to Vilém Růt of Dírná, who had the building rendered with red plaster, from which it got its name Červená Lhota. The last of the Ruts, Bohuslav, had to leave the Bohemian lands as an Utraquist after the 1620 Battle of White Mountain.

In 1621, Červená Lhota was inhabited by Antonio Bruccio, who died in 1639 without an heir. With his death, Lhota lost its function as a residence, and it was used by his successors as occasional cottage. In 1641, it was acquired by the aristocrat Vilém Slavat of Chlum and Košumberk, and later it passed into the hands of the Windisch-Graetz family. Bedřich Arnošt Windisch-Graetz and his son Leopold dragged the dominion into great debts due to their outdated style of economics, so the custodian of his under-aged successor Joseph Nicholas recommended the sale of the dominion. In 1755 the castle then was obtained by the Barons of Gudenus. Franz de Paul, Baron of Gudenus, shortly afterwards initiated several constructions, which were brought to an abrupt halt in 1774 by a great fire, which destroyed most of the agricultural buildings.

In 1776, Červená Lhota welcomed a new owner, Baron Ignác Stillfried, a progressive aristocrat of Prussian Silesia, who from 1796 accommodated the composer Carl Ditters von Dittersdorf at the castle. His son sold the dominion to Jakub Veith in 1820. His daughter Terezie sold the castle again in 1835, this time into the princely hands of Heinrich Eduard von Schönburg-Hartenstein, who gave the castle to his son Josef Alexander von Schönburg-Hartenstein. He died in 1937 and was buried in the newly built tomb, and thus spared the destructive events of the new war, which ended the castle's aristocratic history.

After the Czechoslovak state confiscated the building in 1946, a children's clinic was established there. A year later, the castle was granted to a National Culture Commission, and in 1949 it was opened to the public.

== Description ==
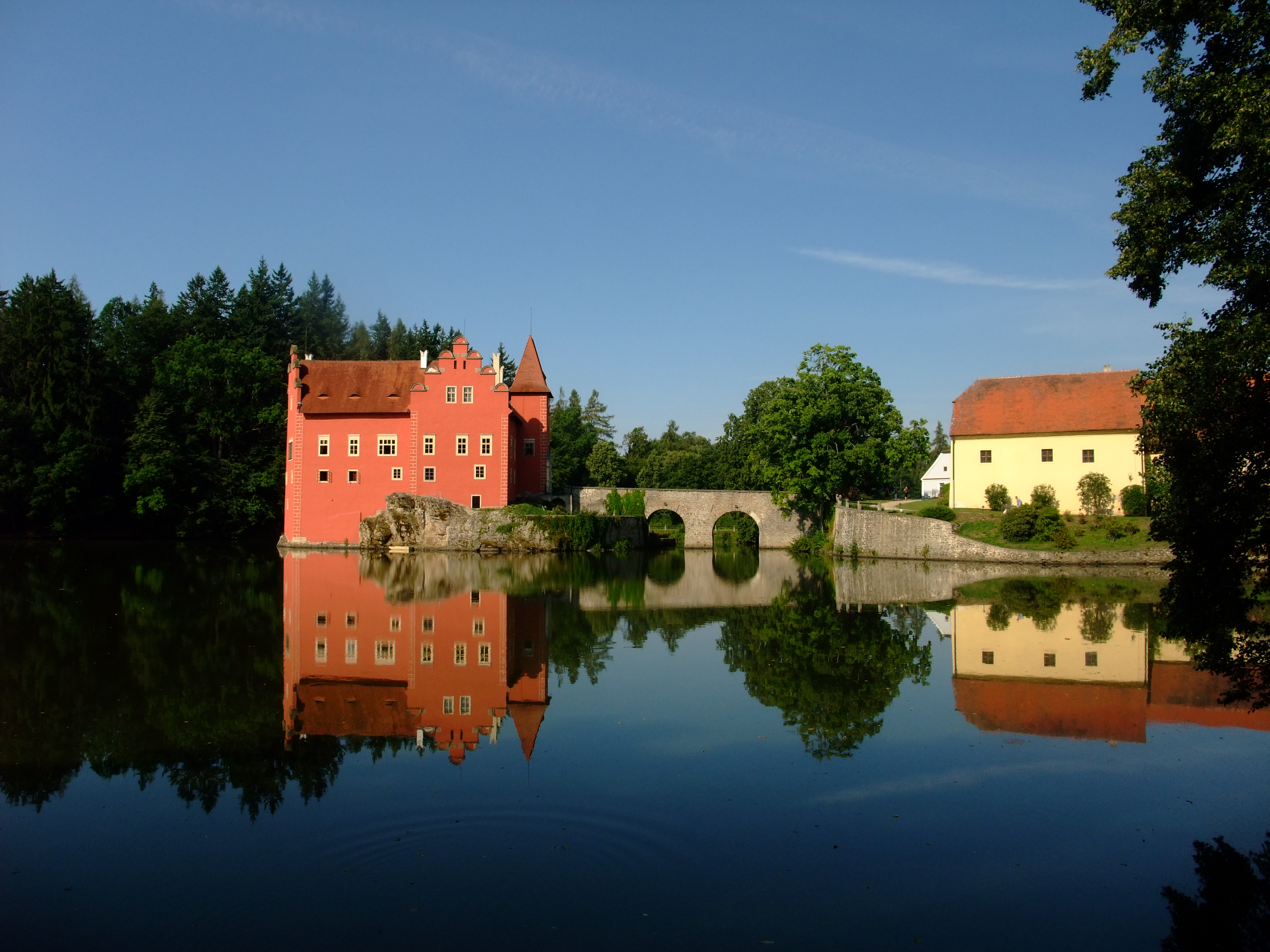
Červená Lhota

The four-winged two-story castle, with a small courtyard in the center, occupies the whole rock and juts into the fishpond. A stone bridge, built in 1622, links the castle with the banks of the pond, replacing the original drawbridge. The interiors have an extensive collection of historic furniture, tiled stoves, pictures, porcelain and other items. The southern edge of the fishpond is covered in thick forest, which forms a backdrop to the castle. On the northern side is a landscaped park where the Renaissance Chapel of the Holy Trinity is situated. A marked circular path trenches around the fishpond. Rowing boats can be hired near the castle.

== Tourism ==
Červená Lhota Castle is a tourist destination of regional significance. It is visited by approximately 50,000 visitors per year.

== Gallery ==
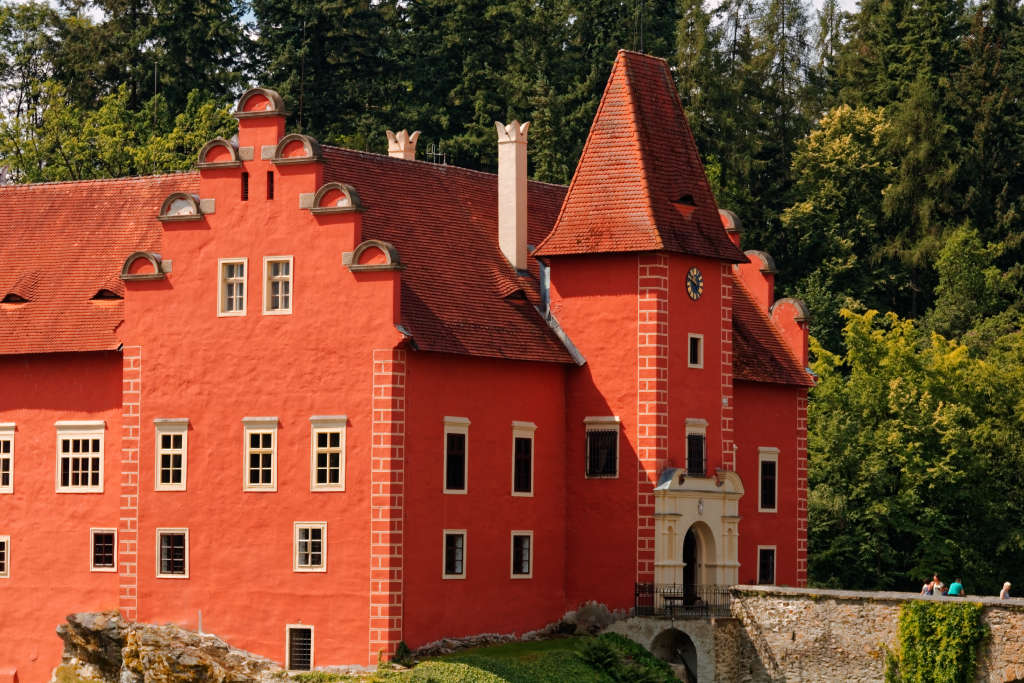
Entrance

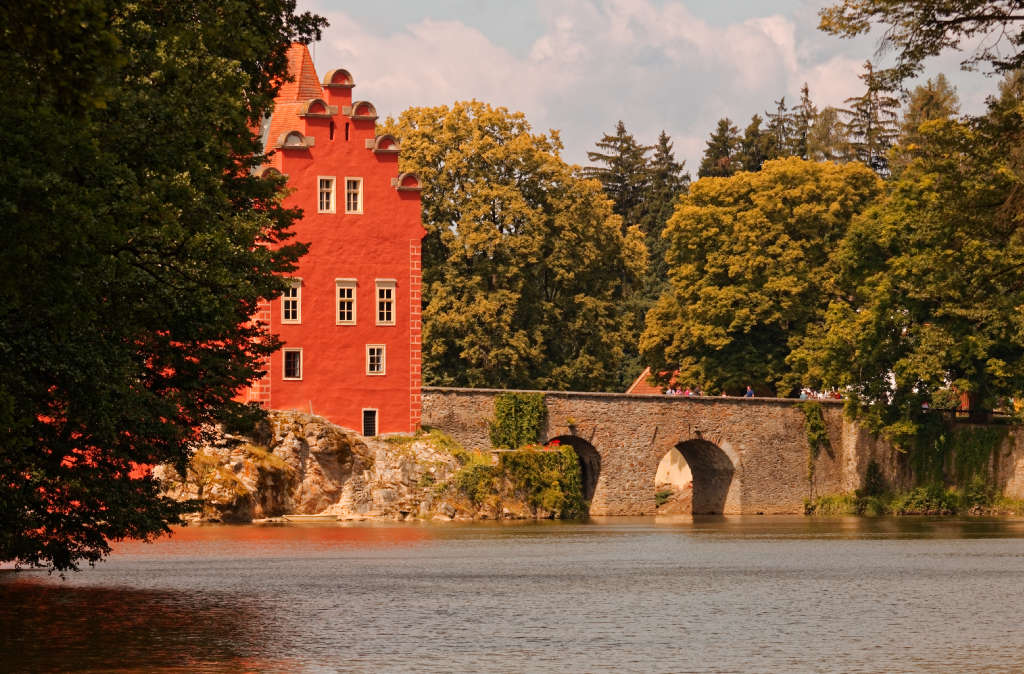
Rear view

== See also ==
- Blatná Castle
- Švihov Castle
