= Parr =

Parr may refer to:

== People ==
- Parr (artist) (1893–1969), Inuk artist
- Parr (surname)

== Places ==
United Kingdom

- Parr, St Helens, a township in Merseyside
- Parr Brook, a stream in Greater Manchester

United States

- Parr, Indiana
- Parr, Virginia

== Other uses ==
- Parr (1797 ship)
- Pakistan Atomic Research Reactor
- Parr Nuclear Station, an experimental nuclear reactor in Parr, South Carolina
- Parr, one of the stages of a juvenile salmon's life cycle
