= Johann Christoph von Paar =

Postmaster for Inner Austria

- Born: ca. 1590; Inner Austria
- Died: 1636
- Occupation: postmaster for the Habsburg hereditary lands
- Spouse: Catharina Freiin von Herbersdorf
- Children: Karl
- Parent(s): Johann Baptist von Paar; Afra Sidonia von Haim zu Reichenstein

Johann Christoph von Paar (? - 1636) was the Regional postmaster for Inner Austria, a post he appears to have inherited from his father. The principal route operated from Vienna via Graz to Venice and it was in Graz that von Paar held the office, under the Archduke Ferdinand who later became the Emperor, Ferdinand II.

== Life ==
Johann Christoph, Lord of Paar was born around 1590, into the noble House of Paar. He was the third and youngest son of Johann Baptist von Paar by his marriage to Afra Sidonia von Haim zu Reichenstein (1535–1593). The family had their family residence at Schloss Hartberg in the mountains to the east of Graz. In or before 1622 Ferdinand II appointed Johann Christoph to the privy council in recognition of his loyal service.

On 22 October 1622 he purchased the main post office in Vienna from Johann Jacob von Magno which involved taking on the postal service across the region covered by Lower Austria, and during 1623 the emperor confirmed him in all the associated privileges. That made him by some criteria the Austrian postmaster general. In 1624 he was also given responsibility for the postal services covering Bohemia and Moravia, which was subsequently extended to include Hungary. In the end his postal mandate covered all the principal Habsburg hereditary lands with the exception of Silesia. Confirmation followed in 1630, with clarification that the office might be inherited, always passing to the eldest male heir.

In 1636 he took the opportunity to ask the emperor to extend his role to include imperial and government correspondence. The idea ran into opposition from the Thurn und Taxis dynasty who protested that such an extension of von Paar's postal duties would have interfered with their own privileges regarding the "Reichs-General-Postmeisteramt" (loosely: "imperial postmaster generalship") and the emperor was obliged to issue a decree clarifying the allocations between the two lucrative monopolies. It was also at the Electoral college meeting at Regensburg in 1636 that von Paar was promised elevation to the rank of "Count" ("Graf"). However, almost immediately after the promise was made, he died, and the title was only conferred on 21 October 1652, by which time, following the deaths of two intervening heirs, the recipient, was his descendant, Karl.
