= Karel Eduard Paar =

Czech jurist (1934–2026)

Fra' Karel Eduard Paar (4 January 1934 – 25 September 2026) was a Czech jurist who was a Bailiff Knight Grand Cross of Justice and the Grand Prior Emeritus of Bohemia of the Sovereign Military Order of Malta.

== Background ==
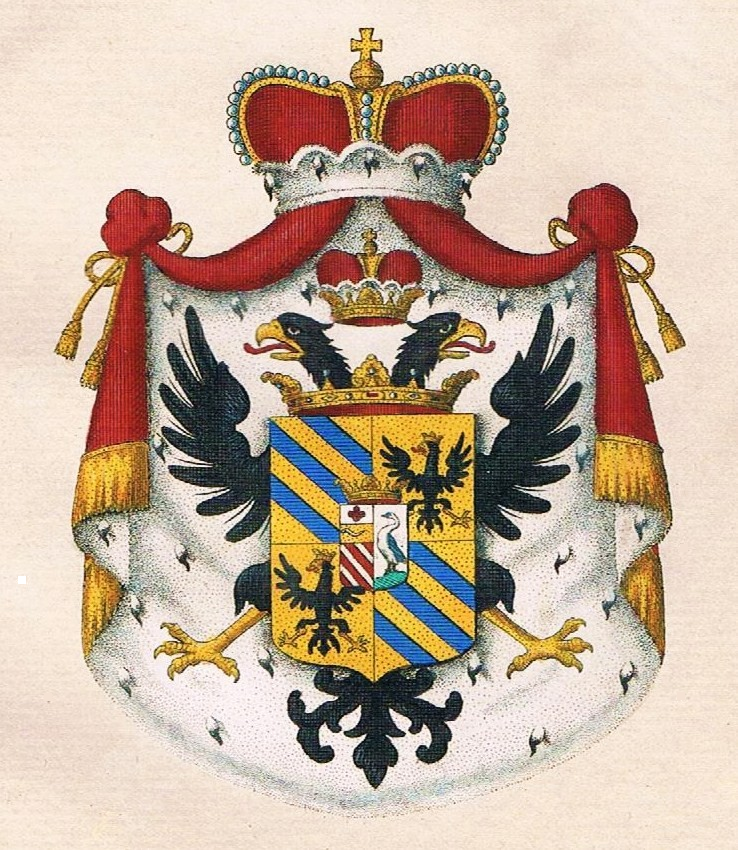
Coat of Arms of Princes Paar

Born into the House of Paar in Prague, then in Czechoslovakia, Karel Eduard was the younger son of Alfons, 6th Prince Paar von Hartberg and Krottenhof (1903–1979) and his wife, Countess Sophia von Schlitz genannt von Görtz (1906–2002). His elder brother Alfons Wenzel, 7th Prince Paar (1932–2016) was married to Marie Gabrielle von Mallinckrodt (b. 1946) and has a son Hubertus, 8th Prince Paar (b. 1971) and a daughter, Désirée Henriette von Wunster (b. 1969). His younger sister Eleonore (1937-2010) married Carlo Cicogna Mozzoni, Conte di Terdobbiate (1922–1979).

As the younger son of Prince Paar, he had the title Graf (count) from birth, although this was not recognised by the Czechoslovak government.

As a child Paar lived in the town of Bechyně in Czechoslovakia. In 1947 he moved to Switzerland for health reasons. In 1948 he was joined in Switzerland by his parents who had fled the Communist coup d'état of that same yeat. In 1954 Paar and his family moved to Austria. Their castle in Bechyně was seized by the Communist government by a decision of the people's court in Týn nad Vltavou, 25 March 1949.

In Austria, Paar worked in the steel industry and then for a company which manufactured agricultural tools.

Paar died on 25 September 2026, at the age of 92.

== Order of Malta ==
Paar's father was a Knight of Honour and Devotion in the Sovereign Military Order of Malta, and had both of his sons join as knights of Honour and Devotion.

From 1962 to 1978 Paar worked in the hospital service of Malteser International.

In 1978 Paar took simple vows as a Knight of Justice. In 1982 he took solemn vows.

In 1981 Paar was elected Grand Prior of Bohemia, in exile in Vienna. He was the first grand prior of Bohemia since the death of Cardinal Karel Kašpar in 1941. He held the position until 1988 when Prince Cyril Toumanoff was elected grand prior. From 1995 to 1996 Paar was Deputy to Grand Prior Prince Toumanoff.

In 1989 Paar was elected a member of the Sovereign Council in Rome.

In March 2004 Paar was elected Grand Prior of Bohemia for a second time, but this time with his residence in Prague. He held this position until 2011.

On 16 February 2019, in observance of Paar's 85th birthday Cardinal Dominik Duka celebrated a thanksgiving mass in Prague in the Church of the Virgin Mary under the Chain.
