= Dražíč =

- Municipality
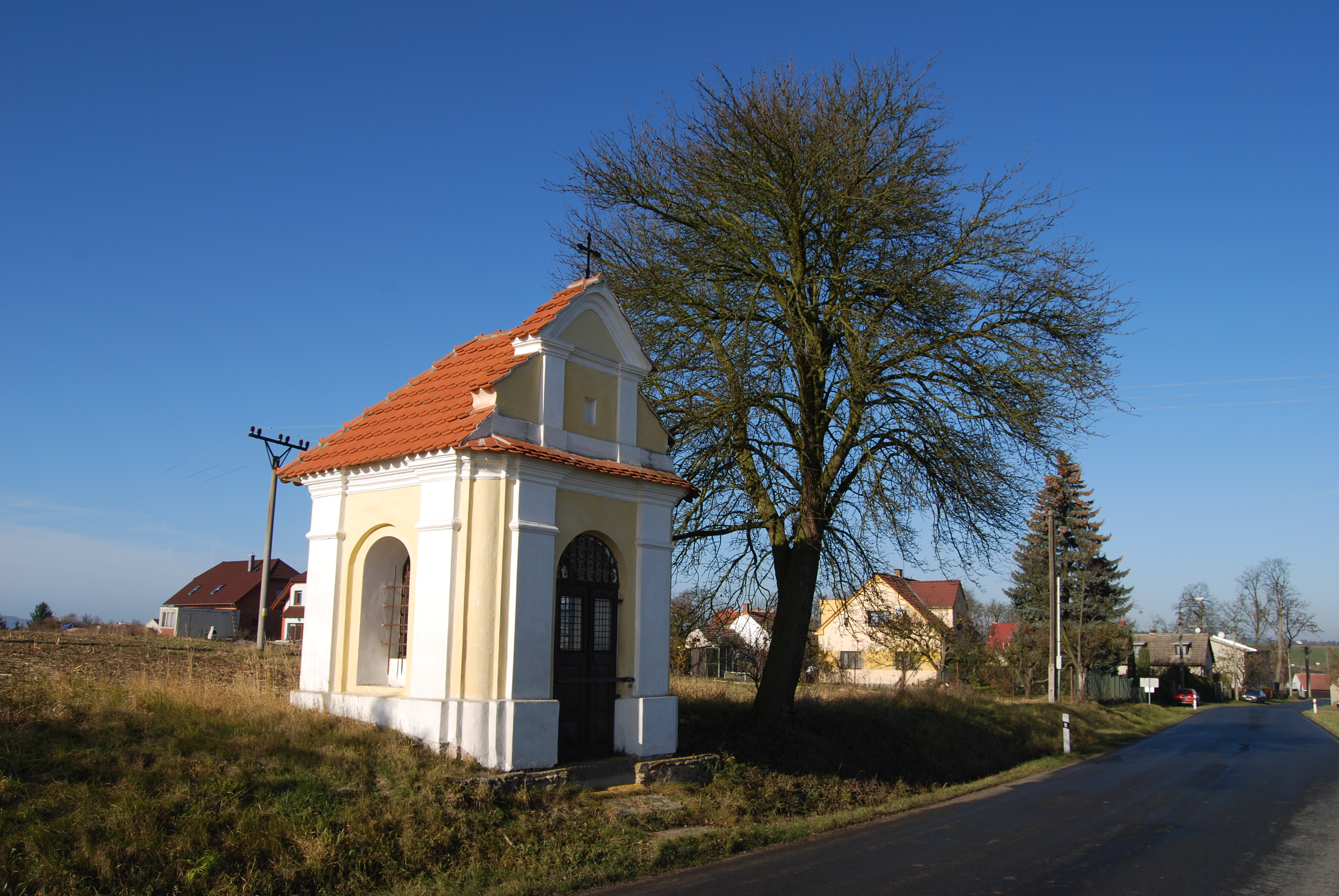
- Chapel of Saint John of Nepomuk

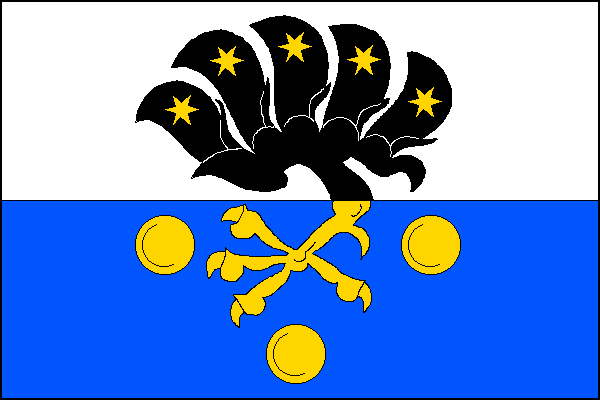
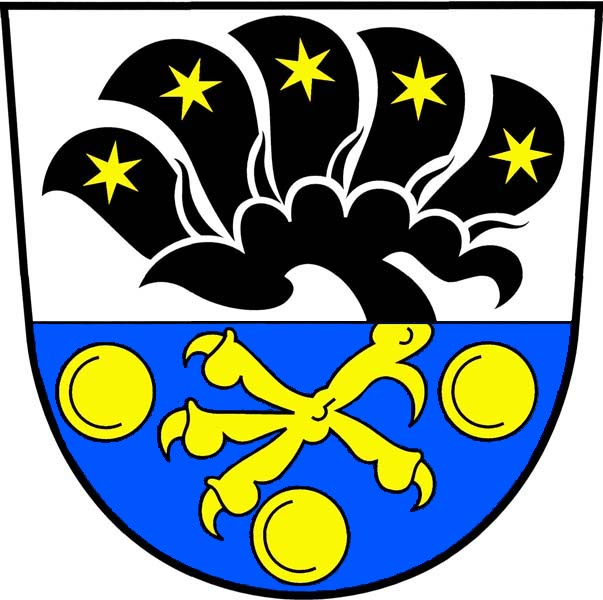
- Flag Coat of arms

- Location in the Czech Republic
- Coordinates: 49°18′21″N 14°23′2″E
- Country: Czech Republic
- Region: South Bohemian
- District: České Budějovice
- First mentioned: 1379

Area
  - Total: 11.34 km^{2} (4.38 sq mi)
- Elevation: 447 m (1,467 ft)

Population (2026-01-01)
  - Total: 283
  - Density: 25.0/km^{2} (64.6/sq mi)
- Time zone: UTC+1 (CET)
  - Summer (DST): UTC+2 (CEST)
- Postal code: 375 01
- Website: www.drazic.cz

Dražíč is a municipality and village in České Budějovice District in the South Bohemian Region of the Czech Republic. It has about 300 inhabitants.

Dražíč lies approximately 38 kilometres (24 mi) north of České Budějovice and 87 km (54 mi) south of Prague.

== Administrative division ==
Dražíč consists of four municipal parts (in brackets population according to the 2021 census):

- Dražíč (165)
- Březí (10)
- Karlov-Nepomuk (54)
- Vranov (12)

== Demographics ==
Historical population
Year	Pop.	±%
1869	963	—
1880	976	+1.3%
1890	902	−7.6%
1900	874	−3.1%
1910	897	+2.6%
1921	860	−4.1%
1930	843	−2.0%
1950	687	−18.5%
1961	621	−9.6%
1970	528	−15.0%
1980	430	−18.6%
1991	327	−24.0%
2001	250	−23.5%
2011	214	−14.4%
2021	241	+12.6%
Source: Censuses
