= Pluhův Žďár =

- Municipality
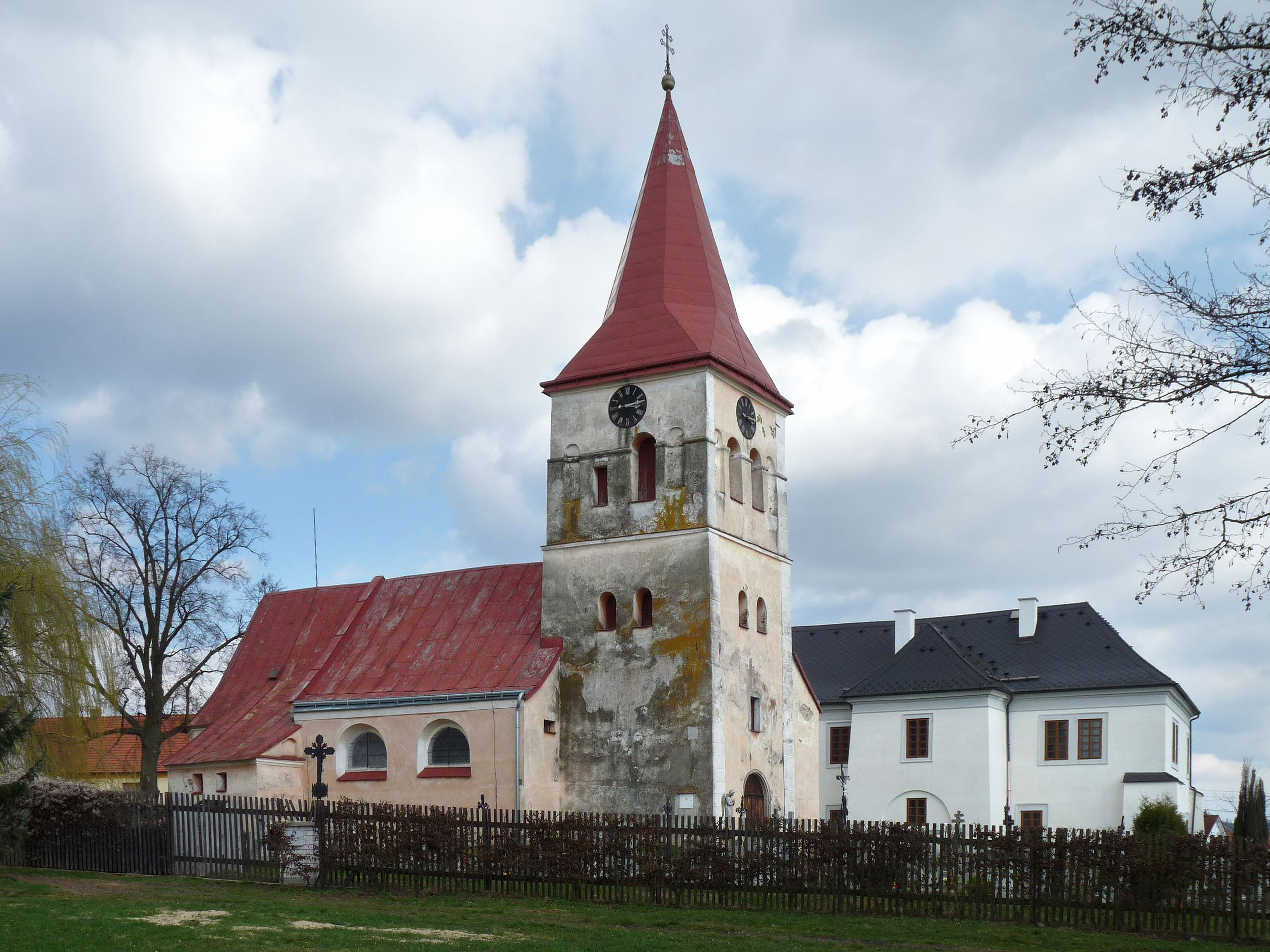
- Church of the Nativity of the Virgin Mary

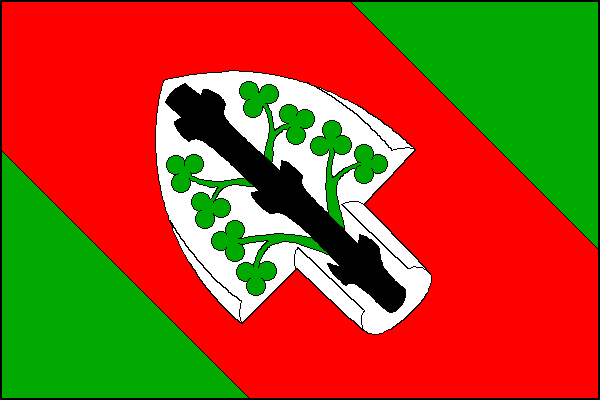
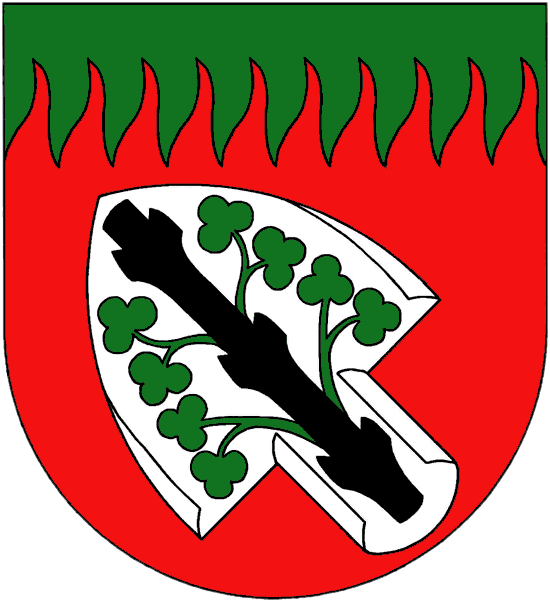
- Flag Coat of arms

- Location in the Czech Republic
- Coordinates: 49°13′26″N 14°53′34″E
- Country: Czech Republic
- Region: South Bohemian
- District: Jindřichův Hradec
- First mentioned: 1267

Area
  - Total: 33.38 km^{2} (12.89 sq mi)
- Elevation: 478 m (1,568 ft)

Population (2026-01-01)
  - Total: 599
  - Density: 17.9/km^{2} (46.5/sq mi)
- Time zone: UTC+1 (CET)
  - Summer (DST): UTC+2 (CEST)
- Postal codes: 378 21, 378 24
- Website: obecpluhuvzdar.cz

Pluhův Žďár is a municipality and village in Jindřichův Hradec District in the South Bohemian Region of the Czech Republic. It has about 600 inhabitants. The municipality is known for the Červená Lhota Castle.

== Administrative division ==
Pluhův Žďár consists of eight municipal parts (in brackets population according to the 2021 census):

- Pluhův Žďár (190)
- Červená Lhota (27)
- Jižná (100)
- Klenov (92)
- Mostečný (54)
- Plasná (30)
- Pohoří (44)
- Samosoly (55)

== Etymology ==
Žďár is a common Czech toponym. In the Middle Ages, the Old Czech word žďár denoted a place where the forest had been cleared and burned to make way for meadows and fields. The name means "Pluh's Žďár", referring to the owners of Žďár.

== Geography ==
Pluhův Žďár is located about 11 kilometres (7 mi) northwest of Jindřichův Hradec and 40 km (25 mi) northeast of České Budějovice. The northern part of the municipality with the Pluhův Žďár village lies in the Křemešník Highlands, while the southern part lies in the Třeboň Basin. The highest point is at 608 m (1,995 ft) above sea level. The municipal territory is rich in small fishponds.

== History ==
The first written mention of Pluhův Žďár is from 1267, when a fortress owned by Pluh of Rabštejn was documented. Until the 15th century, the fortress and the village were owned by the Pluh of Žďár family, after which the village was named.

== Demographics ==
Historical population

Year	Pop.	±%
1869	1,647	—
1880	1,743	+5.8%
1890	1,664	−4.5%
1900	1,624	−2.4%
1910	1,642	+1.1%

Year	Pop.	±%
1921	1,677	+2.1%
1930	1,461	−12.9%
1950	1,099	−24.8%
1961	1,013	−7.8%
1970	883	−12.8%

Year	Pop.	±%
1980	797	−9.7%
1991	710	−10.9%
2001	644	−9.3%
2011	611	−5.1%
2021	592	−3.1%

Source: Censuses

== Transport ==
There are no railways or major roads passing through the municipality.

== Sights ==
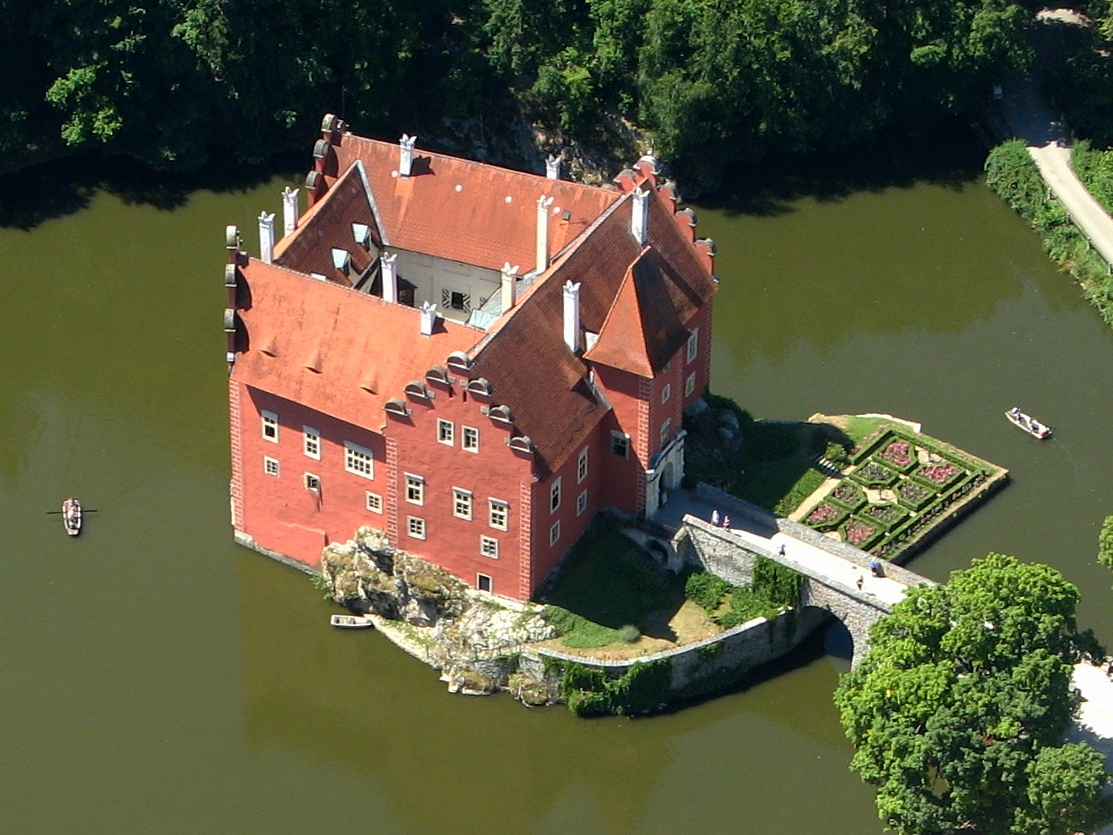
Červená Lhota Castle

The municipality is known for the Červená Lhota Castle. It is located in Červená Lhota, on a rocky island in the fishpond Zámecký rybník. The first record of the castle is from 1465. It was rebuilt in the neo-Gothic style in the 1840s–1860s. Its current appearance is the result of the Neo-Renaissance reconstruction in 1901–1910. It is one of the most visited castles in the region. For its value, it is protected as a national cultural monument.

A landmark in the centre of Pluhův Žďár is the local castle. It was originally a Renaissance fortress from the 16th century, rebuilt into the castle in the second half of the 17th century and further rebuilt in the first half of the 18th century. Today it is privately owned.

The Church of the Nativity of the Virgin Mary was founded in 1542. In 1717, it was extended.

== Notable people ==
- Carl Ditters von Dittersdorf (1739–1799), Austrian composer, violinist and silvologist; died here
