= Karl, 4th Prince Paar =

Member of the Princely Paar family

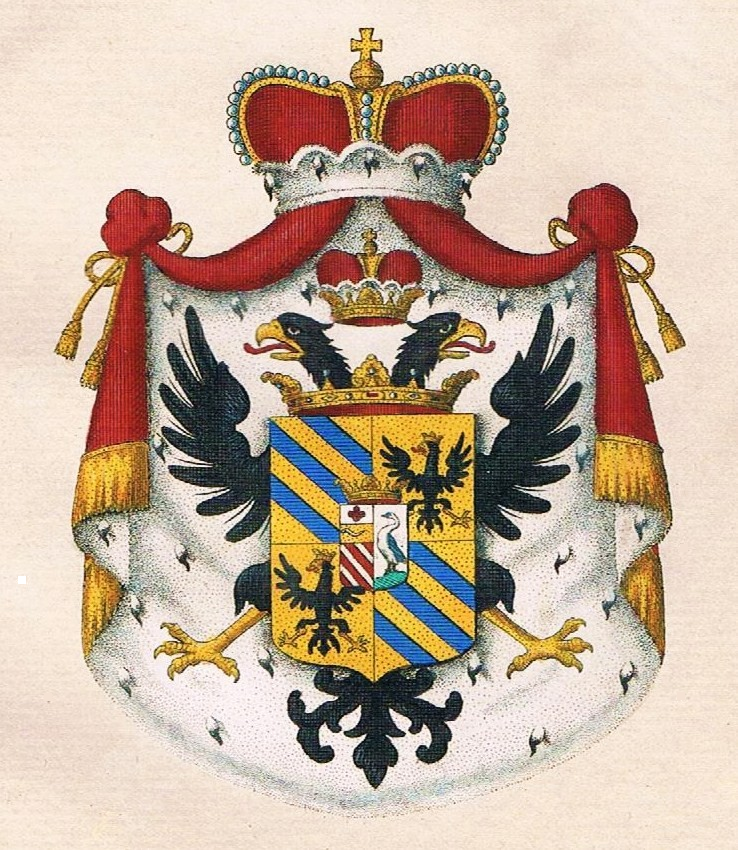
Coat of arms of the Princes Paar

Karl Wenzel Ludwig von Paar, 4th Prince Paar (6 January 1806 – 17 January 1881), also Baron of Hartberg and Krottenstein, was an Austrian aristocrat.

== Early life ==
Born into the prominent Austrian House of Paar, Karl Wenzel Ludwig Paar von Hartberg und Krottenstein was born on 6 January 1806 in Brieg in the Principality of Brieg, Province of Silesia. (Note: Today, Brieg (Brzeg) is in the Opole Voivodeship in southwestern Poland) He was the third son of Johann Karl Josef Anton Veit von Paar, 3rd Prince Paar (1773–1819) and Countess Guidobaldine von Cavriani (1783–1861). Among his siblings were Count Alfred von Paar, a Chamberlain, Privy Councillor and Lieutenant Field Marshal; Countess Guidobaldine von Paar (who married Count Franz Seraphin von Kuefstein, Privy Councillor, Chamberlain and Chief Court Master); Count Wenzel von Paar, a Major in the Austrian Army; and Count Ludwig von Paar, a diplomat who married Countess Maria Anna Esterházy von Galántha.

His paternal grandparents were Johann Wenzel 2nd Fürst Paar von Hartberg und Krottenstein (1744 - 1812) and Princess Maria Antonia of Liechtenstein (a daughter of Johann Nepomuk Karl, Prince of Liechtenstein). His maternal grandparents were Count Ludwig Franz Cavriani (1739-1799) and Countess Johanna Terezie of Kolowrat-Novohradský (a daughter of Count František Ferdinand of Kolowrat-Novohradský).

== Career ==
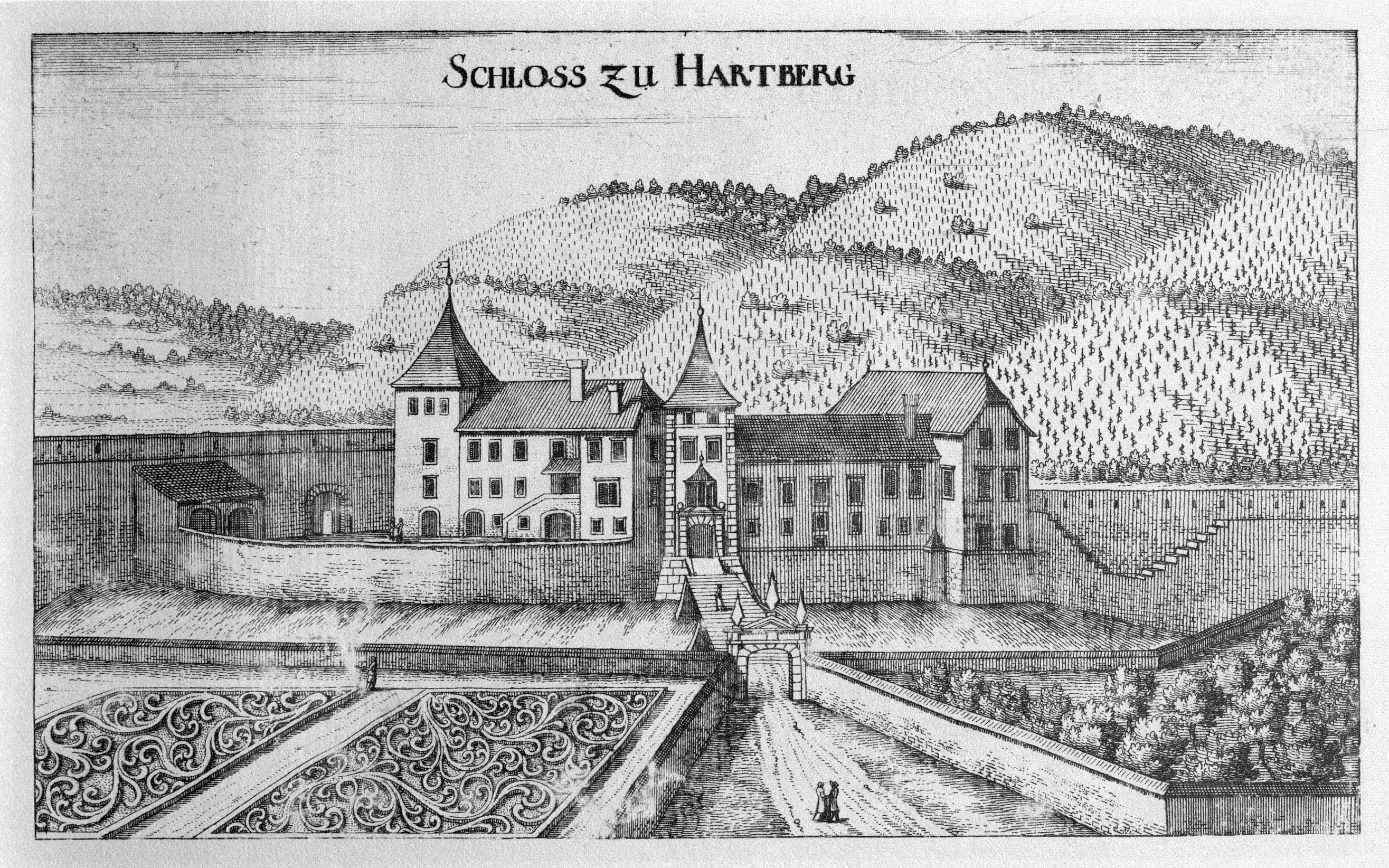
Schloss Paar in Hartberg, Styria (1681)

He was the owner of the Lordships of Hartberg and Stein in Styria, as well as Bechin, Kardarzetschiz, Ždiar, Zdechowitz, Gross-Jerschitz, and Hohen-Wessely in Bohemia.

He was the last to hold the title of Obersthof and Hereditary Grand-Master of the Posts of the Imperial Court.

The prince served as Chamberlain since 1830, and a Privy Councillor and hereditary member of the House of Lords since 1861. In 1862, he was awarded the Order of the Golden Fleece.

He sold the pension associated with his title of General Postmaster to the Court Chamber (German: Hofkammer).

== Personal life ==
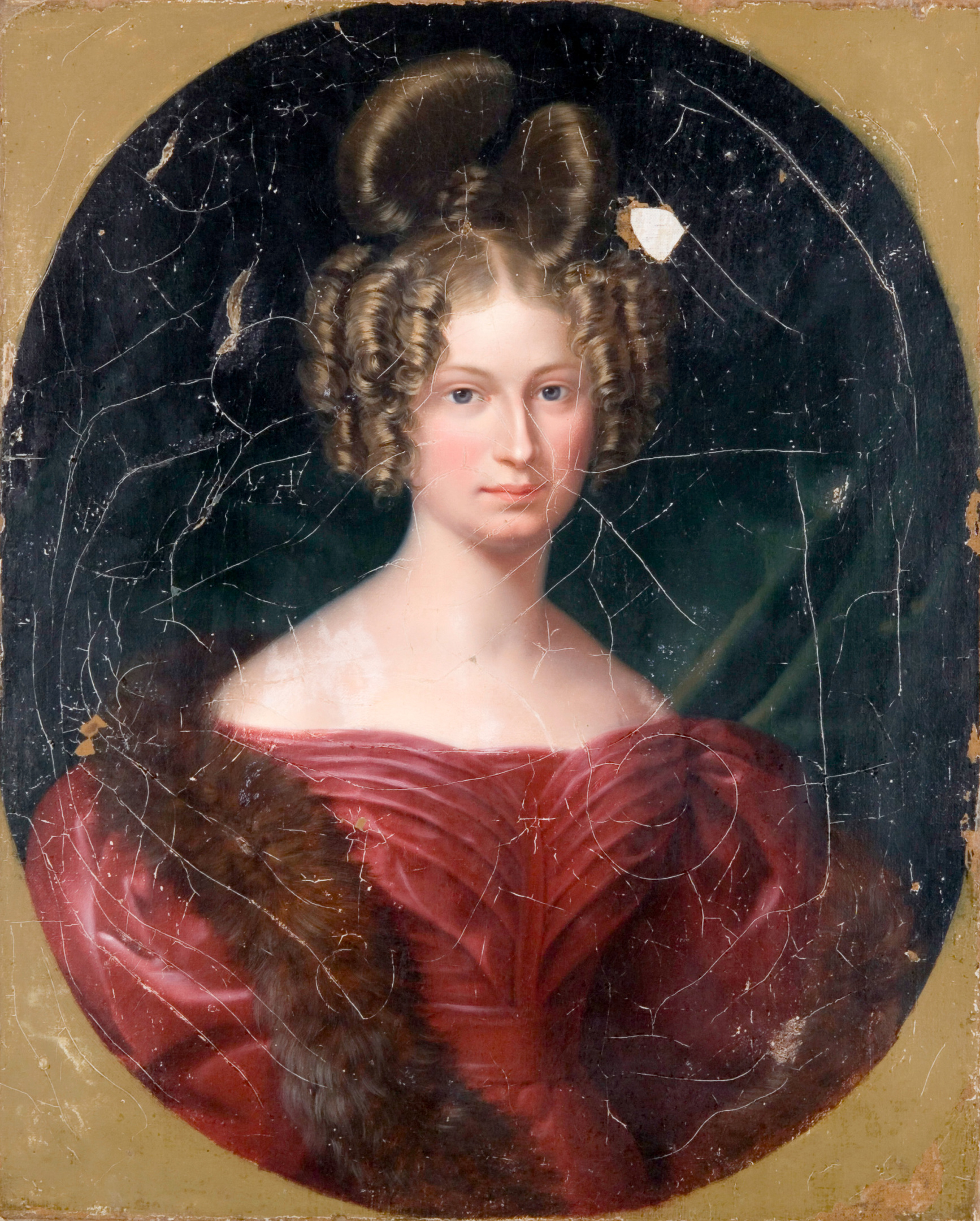
Portrait of his wife, Princess Ida of Liechtenstein, by Joseph Karl Stieler, c. 1830

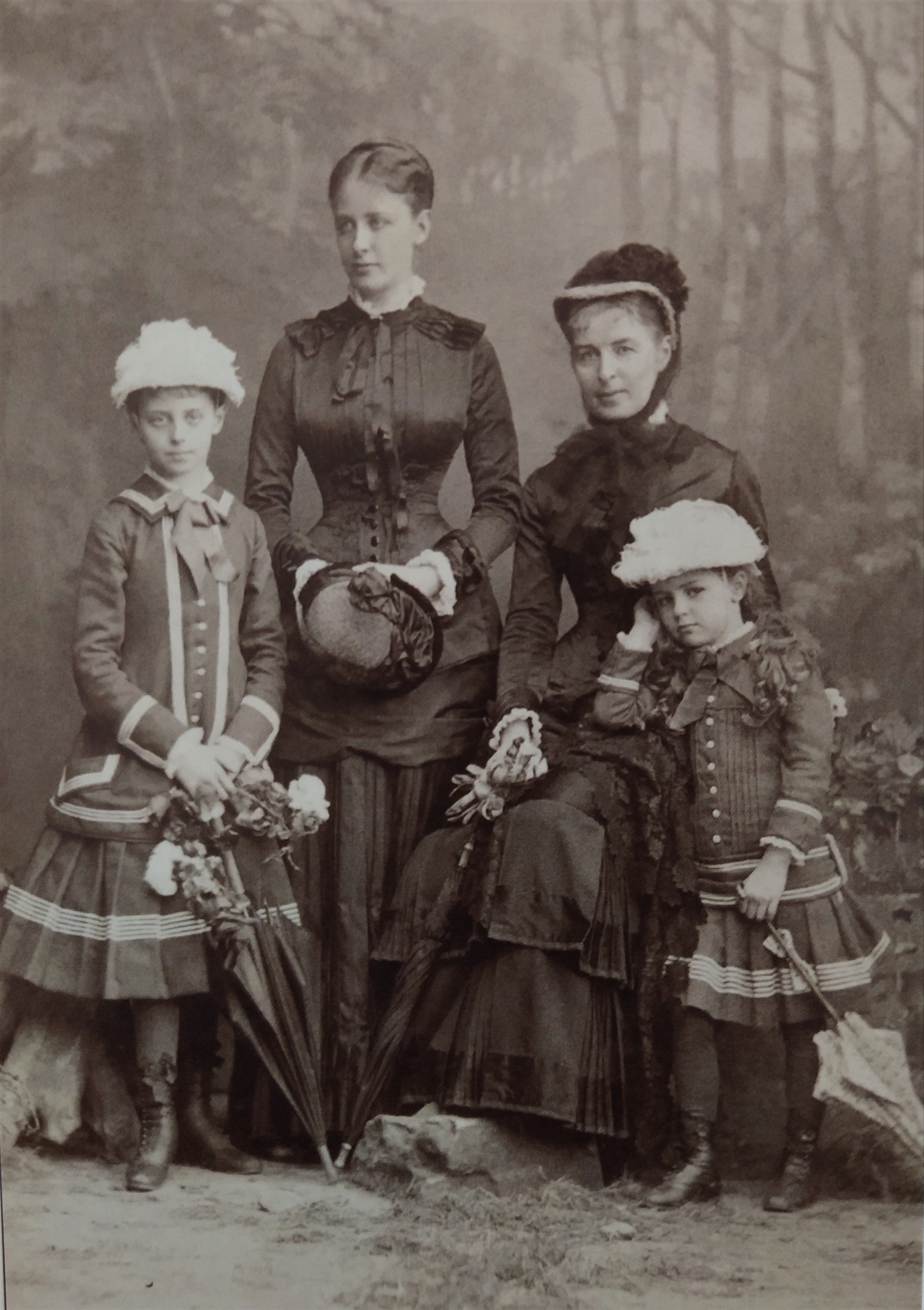
Photograph of his daughter, Eleonore, and granddaughters, Ida, Marie, and Sofia, from the late 1870s

On 1832, Paar was married to Princess Ida Leopoldine Sophie Marie Josephine Franziska of Liechtenstein, youngest daughter of Johann I Joseph, Prince of Liechtenstein and Landgravine Josepha of Fürstenberg-Weitra. Together, they were the parents of:

- Countess Guidobaldine Josepha Sophia Maria von Paar (1833–1904), who died unmarried.
- Karl Johann Wenzel von Paar, 5th Prince Paar (1834–1917), who married Margravine Leopoldine Carolina Maria Justiniana von Pallavicini, in 1866.
- Countess Eleonore Ida Marie von Paar (1835–1913), who married Count Ernst Karl von Hoyos-Sprinzenstein, the son of Count Henrich von Hoyos-Sprinzenstein, and Countess Felicia Zichy von Zich und Vásonkeö, in 1856.
- Count Rudolph Johann Baptist Liberat von Paar (1836–1873), who married Countess Antonia Theresia Brigitta von Meraviglia-Crivelli in 1864. After her death in 1867, he married Countess Anna Maria von Stürgkh in 1872.
- Count Eduard Maria Nicolaus von Paar (1837–1919), Adjutant General of Emperor Franz Joseph I of Austria.
- Countess Josephine Marie Baldine Caroline Ida von Paar (1839–1916), who married Count Ladislaus Joseph Maria Nikolaus Eugen Franz de Paula Severin von Falkenhayn, in 1861. After his death in 1865, she married Eugen Jaromir Czernin von und zu Chudenitz in 1879.
- Count Alois Marie Carl Felician von Paar (1840–1909), General of the Cavalry.
- Countess Francisca de Paula Ida Maria Monica (1842–1881), who married Count Leopold Adalbert Franz Menrad Felix von Podstatzky-Lichtenstein in 1862.
- Countess Maria Josepha Quido Baldina von Paar (1843–1914)
- Countess Leontine Maria Ida Quido Baldine von Paar (1844–1912), who married Count Oswald August Ernst Adolph Karl von Kielmansegg in 1867.
- Countess Henriette Eleonora Josepha Maria von Paar (1848–1848), who died young.
- Countess Sophia Maria Josepha Ida Domicilla von Paar (1850–1874), who married Count Karl Olivier Zdenko Friedrich Anna Wallis von Carrighmain in 1873.

Paar died on 17 January 1881 in at Bechyně in southern Bohemia (today the Czech Republic) and was succeeded by his eldest son, Karl.
