= Zdechovice =

Zdechovice may refer to places in the Czech Republic:

- Zdechovice (Hradec Králové District), a municipality and village in the Hradec Králové Region
- Zdechovice (Pardubice District), a municipality and village in the Pardubice Region
