= Oswald von Kielmansegg =

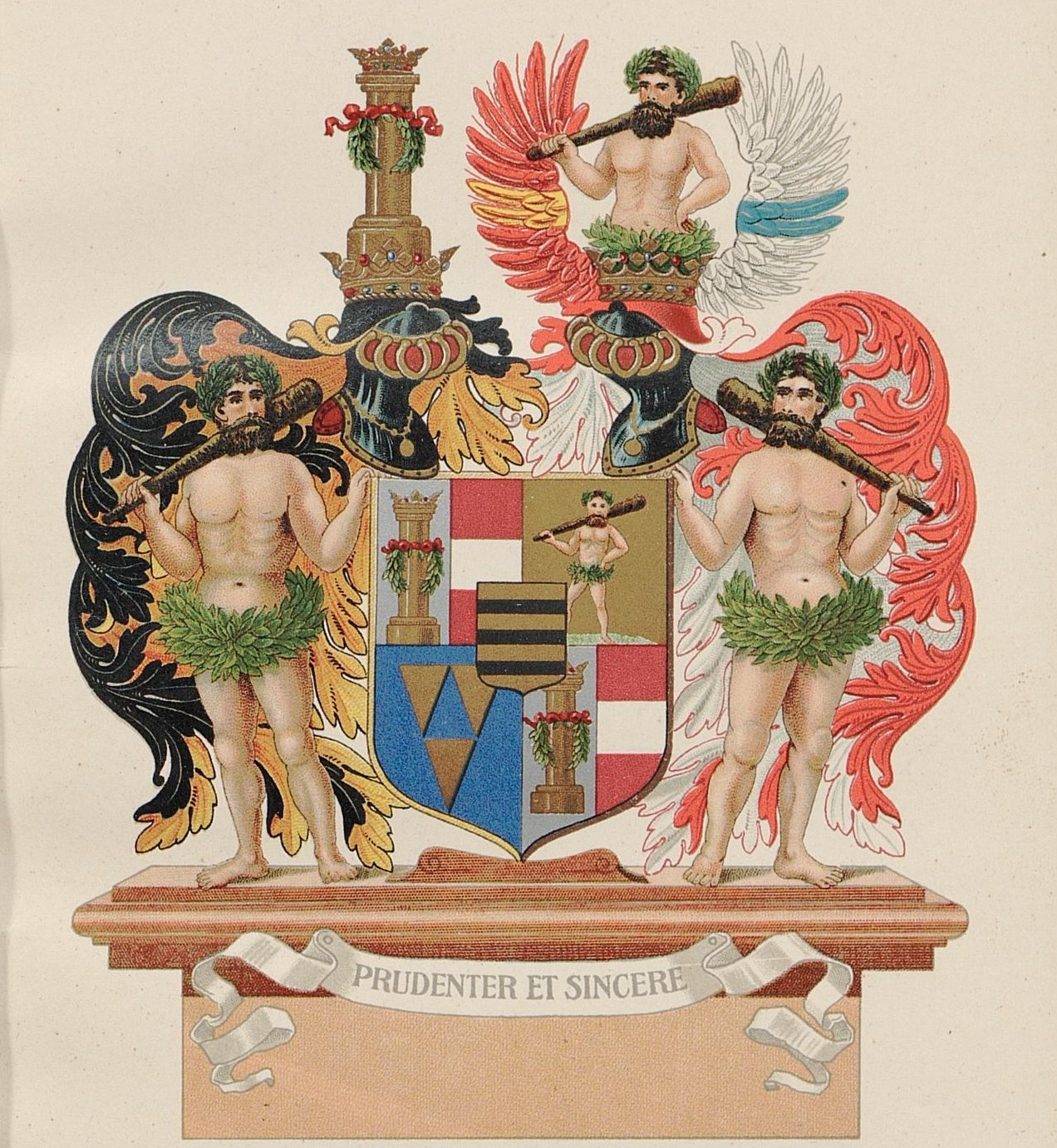
Coat of arms of the Counts Kielmansegg

Count Oswald August Ernst Adolph Karl von Kielmansegg (17 July 1838 – 24 September 1896) was a German Lieutenant Field Marshal in the Austro-Hungarian service.

== Early life ==
Kielmansegg was born on 17 July 1838 in Hanover into the Holstein/Hanoverian branch of the Kielmansegg family, which had special ties to the House of Welf. He was the third son of Count Eduard Georg Ludwig William Howe von Kielmansegg (1804–1879), Minister-President of the Kingdom of Hanover from 1855 to 1862, and his wife, Juliane Sophie Wilhelmine Friederike Johanne von Zesterfleth zu Bergfried (1808–1880). Among his brothers were Imperial and Royal naval officer Count Alexander von Kielmansegg, and Count Erich von Kielmansegg, later Governor of Lower Austria and briefly Minister-President of Cisleithania in 1895.

His paternal grandparents were Count Ludwig Friedrich von Kielmansegg and Friederike Eleonore Juliane von Wallmoden-Gimborn (a daughter of Lieutenant-General Count Johann Ludwig von Wallmoden-Gimborn, an illegitimate son of King George II of Great Britain by his German born mistress, Countess Amalie Sophie Marianne von Wallmoden-Gimborn, created Countess of Yarmouth in 1740). Upon the death of Karl von Wallmoden-Gimborn, the half-brother of his paternal grandmother, in 1883, Kielmansegg came into possession of the Wallmoden estates of Heinde, Walshausen and Uhry in the now Prussian Province of Hanover.

== Career ==
Like his eldest brother, he joined the Austrian military. On 1 October 1853, he entered the Theresian Military Academy, but had to leave due to illness on 22 September 1855. After recovering from his health, he joined the Imperial and Royal Dragoons (14th Regiment "Prince of Windisch-Graetz") as a Cadet in 1856. On 1 March 1858, he became a Lieutenant in the Imperial and Royal Dragoons 8th Regiment "Colonel Ferdinand Salvator". On 1 April 1859, he was promoted to First Lieutenant in the 6th Regiment "Ludwig Graf von Wallmoden-Gimborn Cuirassiers.

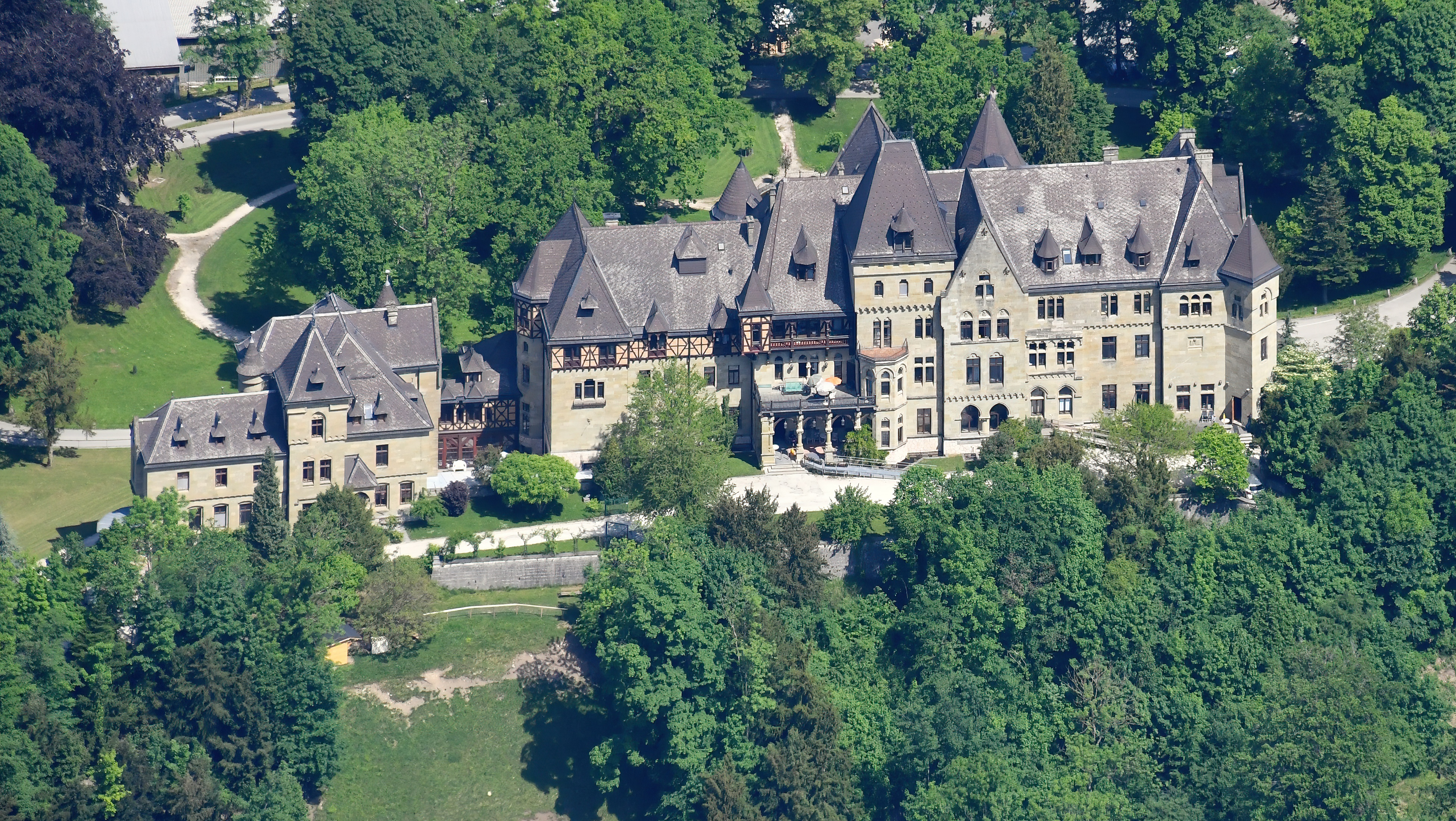
Cumberland Castle

Shortly before the outbreak of the Austro-Prussian War, on 17 May 1866, he was promoted to Rittmaster 2nd Class and transferred to the Life Guard Gendarmerie, which was entrusted with the protection of the Imperial institutions in Vienna. During the war, he served as an aide-de-camp to Count August von Degenfeld-Schonburg, the General of the Artillery who was commander of the Floridsdorf bridgehead.

He was repeatedly assigned to special missions in the Prussian headquarters. On 1 November 1867, Kielmansegge was transferred with the same rank to the 5th Styrian, Carinthian and Carniolan Dragoons (Nicholas I, Emperor of Russia's Own) and already on 1 December of the same year to the Uhlan Regiment "Archduke Carl" No. 3.

He was then assigned to staff officer training at the Imperial and Royal War School. After successfully completing this, he was assigned to the General Staff in September 1873, working in the National Description Bureau (Landesbeschreibung) until 1874, and then as a General Staff Officer in the 1st Infantry Division in Vienna. On 1 May 1876, he joined the Imperial and Royal Uhlan Regiment "Prince of Schwarzenberg" No. 2., where he was appointed Regimental Commander on 1 November 1882, before being promoted to Colonel on 1 May 1883. On December 29, 1888, he was appointed Commander of the 21st Cavalry Brigade, and on 1 May 1889, he was promoted to Major General. From 24 September 1889, Kielmansegge commanded the 8th Cavalry Brigade in Prague.

=== Obersthofmeister ===
Effective December 3, 1891, he was granted leave to assume the position of Obersthofmeister (Chief Court Master) overseeing the Court of the Ernst August of Hanover, Duke of Cumberland, (Note: Ernst August of Hanover, Duke of Cumberland (1845–1923) was the eldest child and only son of George V of Hanover and his wife, Marie of Saxe-Altenburg. Ernest Augustus was deprived of the throne of Hanover upon its annexation by Prussia in 1866 and later the Duchy of Brunswick in 1884. Later, Ernest Augustus was deprived of his British peerages and honours for having sided with Germany in World War I.) at the then-new Cumberland Castle in Gmunden. In this position, he was promoted to Lieutenant Field Marshal on 6 May 1894.

== Personal life ==
On 28 November 1867, Kielmansegg was married to Countess Leontine Maria Ida Quido Baldine von Paar (1844–1912), a daughter of Karl, 4th Prince Paar von Hartberg und Krottenstein and his wife, Princess Ida of Liechtenstein (youngest daughter of Johann I Joseph, Prince of Liechtenstein and Landgravine Josepha of Fürstenberg-Weitra). Together, they were the parents of:

- Countess Julie Ida Marie von Kielmansegg (b. 1868), a lady-in-waiting to Princess Thyra of Denmark, the Duchess of Cumberland.
- Countess Marie Zoë Luise von Kielmansegg (b. 1869)
- Count Karl Eduard Thedel Oswald Josef Johann von Kielmansegg (1871–1953), whose relationship with the dancer Ninan Conti caused a scandal in 1896, later Consul in Varna and heir of Gülzow in Lauenburg.
- Count Eduard Oswald Josef Konrad von Kielmansegg (1874–1941), who married Princess Gabriele Therese von Wrede, daughter of Prince Nikolaus von Wrede (a grandson of Prince Karl Philipp von Wrede); he inherited the Hanoverian estates.
- Countess Ida Franziska Maria Leontine Sophie Cyrilla von Kielmansegg (b. 1877), who married Baron Maximilian von Vittinghoff.
- Count Alois Oswald Rudolf Maria Josef Günther von Kielmansegg (1879–1969), ministerial official, last head of section and retired head of the Welf private library of the House of Braunschweig-Lüneburg in Gmunden.

The Count died suddenly during the night of 24 September 1896 in the remote ducal hunting lodge of Schrattenau near Gmunden. He was buried in Gmunden, where his gravestone is preserved in the cemetery chapel.

=== Descendants ===
Through his son Count Eduard, he was a grandfather of Count Graf Oswald von Kielmansegg (1908–2002), who married Princess Eveline Maria of Croÿ (a daughter of Prince Alexander Marie of Croÿ and Countess Mathilda von Stockau).
