= Zesterfleth =

Zesterfleth may refer to:

- Zesterfleth, an extinct village near Jork, Lower Saxony
- Zesterfleth (family), a German noble family
