= Ludwig von Paar =

Austrian diplomat

Count Ludwig von Paar
- Born: Ludwig Johann Baptist Emanuel von Paar; 26 March 1817; Vienna, Austrian Empire
- Died: 6 January 1893 (aged 75); Merano, Kingdom of Italy
- Noble family: Paar
- Spouse: Countess Marie Anna Esterházy-Galantha (m. 1858; died 1863)
- Issue: Count Ludwig; Count Alfred; Count Karl
- Father: Johann Karl, 3rd Prince von Paar
- Mother: Countess Guidobaldine Cavriani

Count Ludwig Johann Baptist Emanuel von Paar (26 March 1817 – 6 January 1893) was an Austrian diplomat and art collector.

== Early life ==
Ludwig von Paar was a born a member of the House of Paar, a prominent Austrian princely family. He was younger son of Johann Karl, 3rd Prince von Paar (1773–1819), and his wife, Countess Guidobaldine Cavriani (1783–1861). Among his siblings was older brother, Karl Johann, Prince von Paar (1806–1881).

His paternal grandparents were Wenzel Chrisostumus, 2nd Prince von Paar, and Princess Maria Antonia of Liechtenstein (daughter of the reigning Johann Nepomuk Karl, Prince of Liechtenstein). His maternal grandparents were Count Ludwig Franz Cavriani and Johanna Terezie Novohradský z Kolovrat.

== Career ==
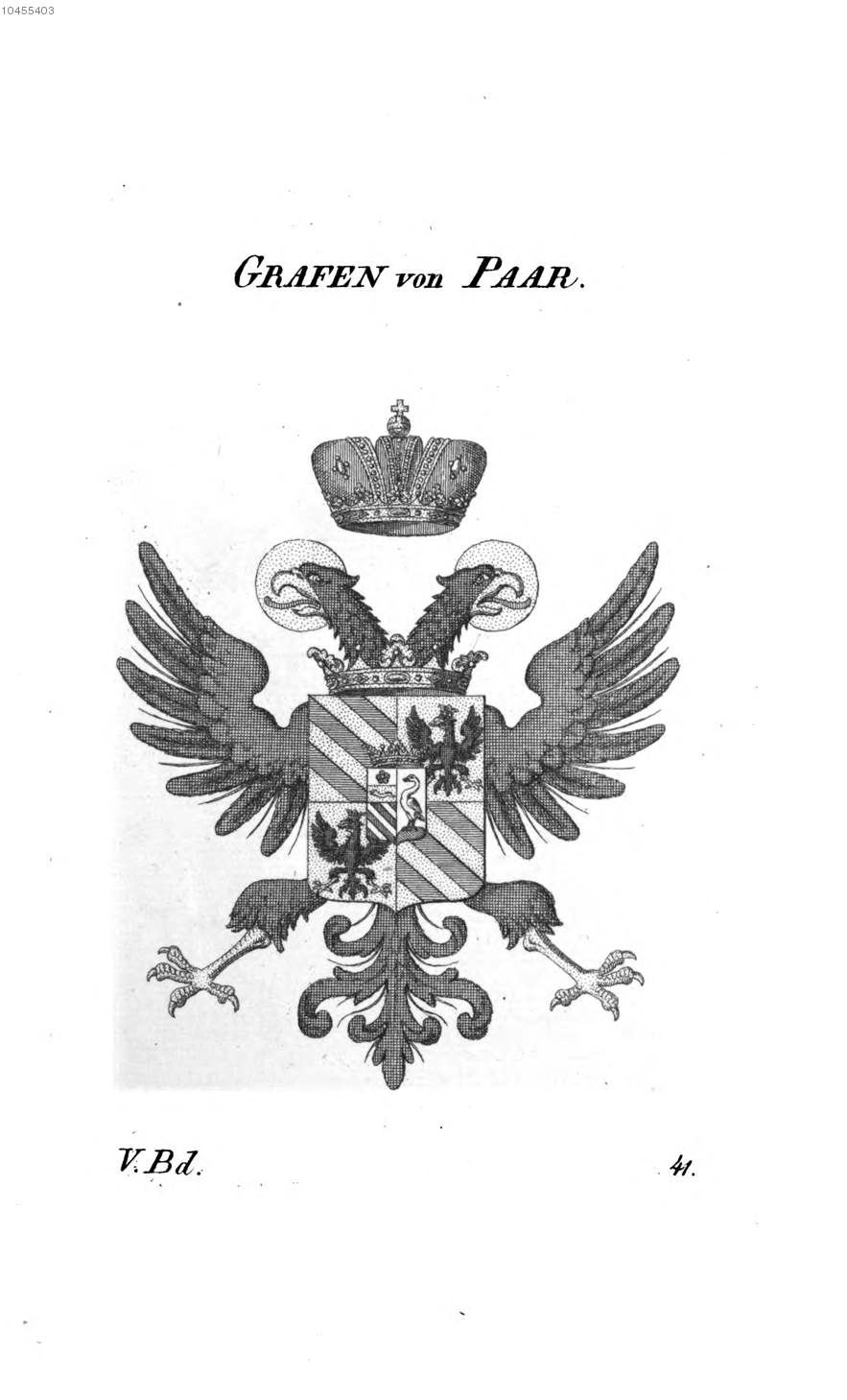
Family coat of arms, from: Tyroff: Coat of arms book of the Austrian monarchy, 1831–1868

Ludwig was in the Foreign Service of the Imperial and Royal, later Imperial and Royal Monarchy, and was Austrian Ambassador to Sardinia-Piedmont from 1853 to 1857, then in the same position in Modena from 1857 to 1859.

In 1859, he moved to Stockholm as Imperial and Royal Envoy to the Swedish Court. From 1864 to 1866 he held the same position at the Electorate of Hesse Court in Kassel; then from 1866 to 1869 at the Danish court, after a mission as the now Austro-Hungarian Ambassador to the Saxon Court in Dresden from 1869 to 1872, he was again in Copenhagen from 1872 to 1873, after which he was transferred in 1873 as Ambassador to the Holy See in Rome, and remained in this post until 1888.

Von Paar owned a notable collection of autographs, including letters from Michelangelo. He was also the owner of Mozart's childhood violin, which was presented to the International Mozarteum Foundation by his son in 1896.

== Personal life ==
On 14 June 1858 in Modena, Count von Paar married Countess Marie Anna Esterházy de Galantha (1834–1863), a daughter of Kázmér Miklós Esterházy de Galántha and Leopoldina Szapáry de Muraszombath (a daughter of Count József Szápáry de Muraszombath). Before her death in Stockholm in 1863, they were the parents of:

- Count Ludwig Casimir Carl Guido Leopold Johann Joseph Maria Nikolaus von Paar (1859–1912), who married Bettina Bibl.
- Count Alfred Marie Joseph Louis Guido Eric von Paar (1861–1861), who died in infancy.
- Count Karl Ludwig Joseph Erich von Paar (1863–1894), who died unmarried.

Count von Paar died on 6 January 1893.

Diplomatic posts
Preceded by Rudolf Apponyi von Nagy-Appony	Austrian Ambassador to Sardinia-Piedmont; 1853–1857	Succeeded by
Preceded by Eduard von Lebzeltern-Collenbach	Austrian Ambassador in Modena; 1857–1859	Succeeded by
Preceded by Ferdinand von Langenau	Austrian Ambassador to Sweden; 1859–1863	Succeeded by Ladislaus von Karnicki
Preceded by Ladislaus von Karnicki	Austrian Ambassador to Hesse-Kassel; 1864–1866	Succeeded by
Preceded by Joseph von Werner	Austro-Hungarian Ambassador to Saxony; 1869–1872	Succeeded by Johann Karl von Frankenstein
Preceded by Raphael von Hübener	Austro-Hungarian Ambassador to the Holy See; 1873–1888	Succeeded by Friedrich Revertera von Salandra
