= Count Erich Kielmansegg =

Austrian politician, Prime Minister of Austria 1895

Hochgeboren Erich Graf von Kielmansegg
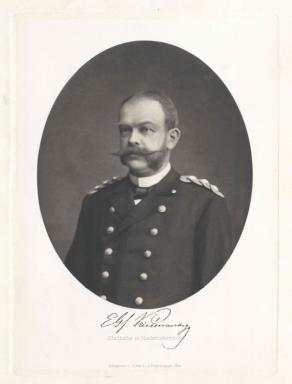
- Count Erich von Kielmansegg (1900; Heliography by Josef Löwy)

Minister-President of Austria
- In office 18 June 1895 – 29 September 1895
- Monarch: Francis Joseph I
- Preceded by: Alfred III, Prince of Windisch-Grätz
- Succeeded by: Count Kasimir Felix Badeni

Personal details
- Born: 13 February 1847 Hanover, Kingdom of Hanover
- Died: 5 February 1923 (aged 75) Vienna, Austria

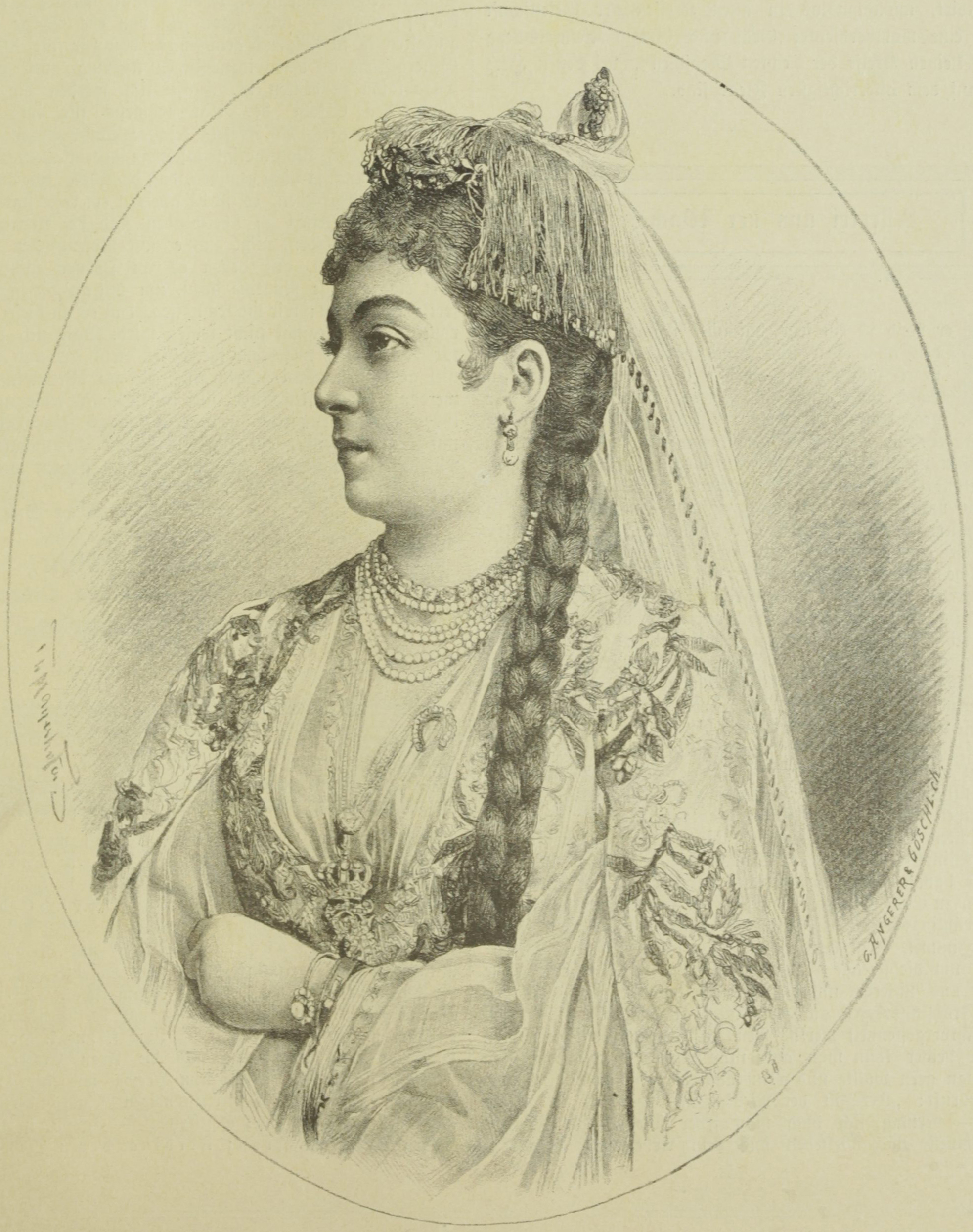
Countess Anastasia von Kielmansegg in a Russian national costume (1891)

Erich Graf von Kielmansegg (13 February 1847 – 5 February 1923) was an Austrian statesman. He served as stadtholder of Lower Austria and short time Minister-President of the Austro-Hungarian Empire in 1895.

== Biography ==
He was born in Hanover, the youngest son of Count Eduard Georg Ludwig William Howe von Kielmansegg (1804–1879), Minister-President of the Kingdom of Hanover from 1855 to 1862, and his wife, Juliane Sophie Wilhelmine Friederike Johanne von Zesterfleth zu Bergfried (1808-1880). His elder brother was Count Oswald von Kielmansegg. His father was a grandson of Lieutenant-General Count Johann Ludwig von Wallmoden-Gimborn, an illegitimate son of King George II of Great Britain by his German-born mistress, Countess Amalie Sophie Marianne von Wallmoden-Gimborn, created Countess of Yarmouth in 1740. He had to emigrate with his father upon the annexation of Hanover by Prussia after the 1866 Austro-Prussian War; they moved to Vienna. Kielmansegg studied Jurisprudence at the universities of Heidelberg and Vienna before entering Austrian civil service in 1870.

From 1876 he served as Hauptmann (captain) of the Baden District, Austria and from 1882 as an official of the state governments in the Cisleithanian crown lands of Bukovina and Carinthia as well as in the Austrian Ministry of the Interior. From 17 October 1889 he was stadtholder of Lower Austria, where he carried through the union of Vienna with the suburbs (Greater Vienna), the Vienna Danube regulation and the expansion of the Donaukanal and the Wien River.

After Minister-President Alfred III, Prince of Windisch-Grätz had resigned over the language conflict with the Young Czech Party in the Kingdom of Bohemia, Kielmansegg, a friend and a confidant of Emperor Francis Joseph I of Austria, was appointed Minister of the Interior and Cisleithanian Prime Minister on 18 June 1895, though only as an acting officeholder until the implementation of the Badeni government on 29 September. He remained Governor of Lower Austria until 18 June 1911, however, he had to cope with the rising political power of the Social Democrats and the Christian Social Party under the popular Vienna mayor Karl Lueger.

== Personal life ==
He was married to Anastasia Lebedeff (1860-1912), a Russian noblewoman whose ancestors came from Prussia at the end of the 13th century. In August 1892 Countess Anastasia von Kielmannsegg allegedly took part in sword duel with Princess Pauline von Metternich over a floral arrangement at the Vienna Musical and Theater Exposition, which was later denied by the Princess as a "ridiculous invention by Italian journalists". The marriage between Erich and Anastasia remained childless.

== Death ==
Retired Kielmansegg died in Vienna from pneumonia, he was buried at the Döbling Cemetery. A born North German he was, with the exception of Chancellor Count Friedrich Ferdinand von Beust, the only Protestant minister of Austria up to this date.
