= Karl, 3rd Prince Paar =

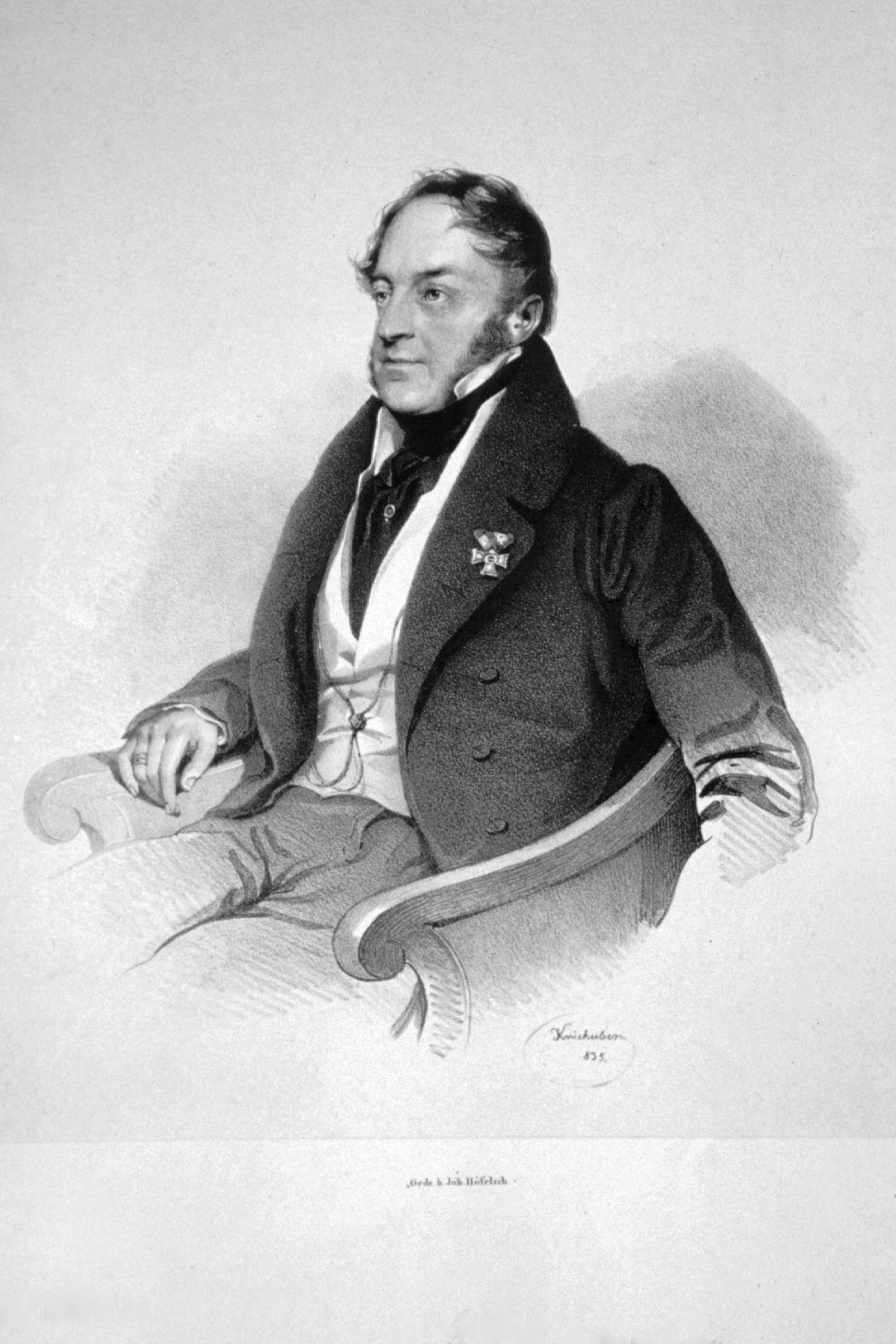
Lithograph of his brother, Count Johann von Paar, by Josef Kriehuber, 1835

Johann Karl Josef Anton Veit von Paar, 3rd Prince Paar (15 June 1773 – 30 December 1819) was an Austrian aristocrat and Major General.

== Early life ==
Paar was born on 15 June 1773 in Vienna, Austria into the noble House of Paar. He was the third son of Wenzel Franz Anton von Paar, 2nd Prince Paar (1744–1812) and his wife, Princess Maria Antonia of Liechtenstein (1749–1813).

He was the brother of Antonia Maria von Paar (second wife of Karl Joseph, 1st Prince of Salm-Reifferscheidt-Raitz); Wenzel von Paar; Count Josef von Paar; Maria Theresia Henriette von Paar (wife of Count François Joseph de Mercy d'Argenteau); Count Johann Baptist von Paar, a Colonel in the Austrian Army; Count Lajos von Paar, a Major in the Austrian Army (who married Countess Maria Henriette von Schallenberg, and Mária Paulina Andrássy de Csíkszentkirály); and Count Niklas Franz von Paar, a Knight of Malta.

His paternal grandparents were Countess Maria Antonia Esterházy von Galántha (a daughter of Count Ferenc Esterházy de Galántha) and Wenzel, 1st Prince Paar, Chamberlain, the Hereditary Grand-Master of the Posts of the Imperial Court.

His maternal grandparents were Johann Nepomuk Karl, Prince of Liechtenstein and Countess Maria Josepha von Harrach-Rohrau.

== Career ==
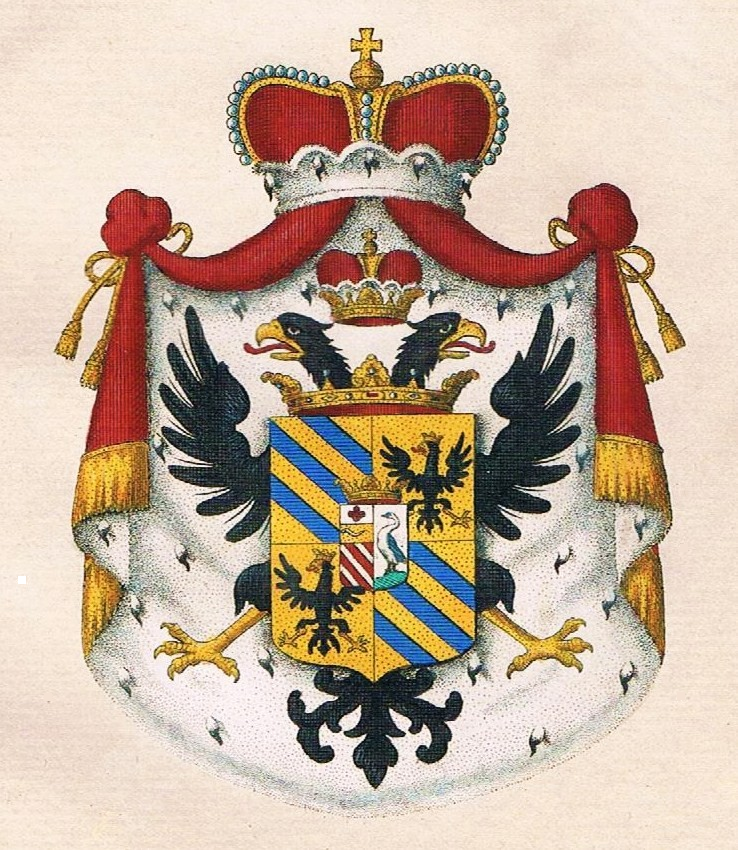
Coat of arms of the Princes Paar

As elder brothers Wenzel and Josef predeceased their father, dying at San Giacomo in 1800, and in 1773, respectively, upon his father's death in 1812, he succeeded as the 3rd Prince Paar.

In 1789, Karl joined the 22nd Infantry Regiment (Count Lacy) as a Lieutenant. He fought in the Turkish War and was promoted to Captain after the War. From 1792 to 1796, he participated in the War of the First Coalition on the Rhine. He then went to Italy, where he participated in the defense of Mantua. In May 1797, Paar was transferred to the 45th Infantry Regiment as a Major.

On 26 March 1799, he fought at Legnago. The Austrians had been driven out of the strategically important village of Paradiso when Paar was ordered to stop any further French advance. He succeeded in recapturing and holding the village. Meanwhile, the French had captured the nearby bridge at Fiume Nuovo. Paar recognized the problem, rallied fleeing troops, and was able to not only recapture the bridge but also attack the French right flank. For this, he was awarded the Knight's Cross of the Order of Maria Theresa on 18 August 1801.

During the battles on the Riviera and against Genoa, he commanded a grenadier battalion as a lieutenant colonel. In 1805, he fought at Caldiero as Colonel of the 45th Infantry Regiment.

Due to his family commitments, he was forced to retire from active service in April 1806. He was granted his retirement with the rank of Major General. He returned to the Austrian Army in 1809 with the War of the Fifth Coalition and commanded a brigade in the Battles of Aspern and Wagram. He was also wounded at Wagram.

In 1815, he was appointed commander of the newly established Infantry Regiment 43 by Emperor Francis II. However, since 1810, he lived primarily on his estates in Styria and Bohemia.

In Vienna, his palace housed the Paar Art Collection, a collection of copperplate engravings consisting of several thousand works and rich in fine pieces. The director of this collection was Karl von Vittinghoff, who was also a famous engraver.

== Personal life ==
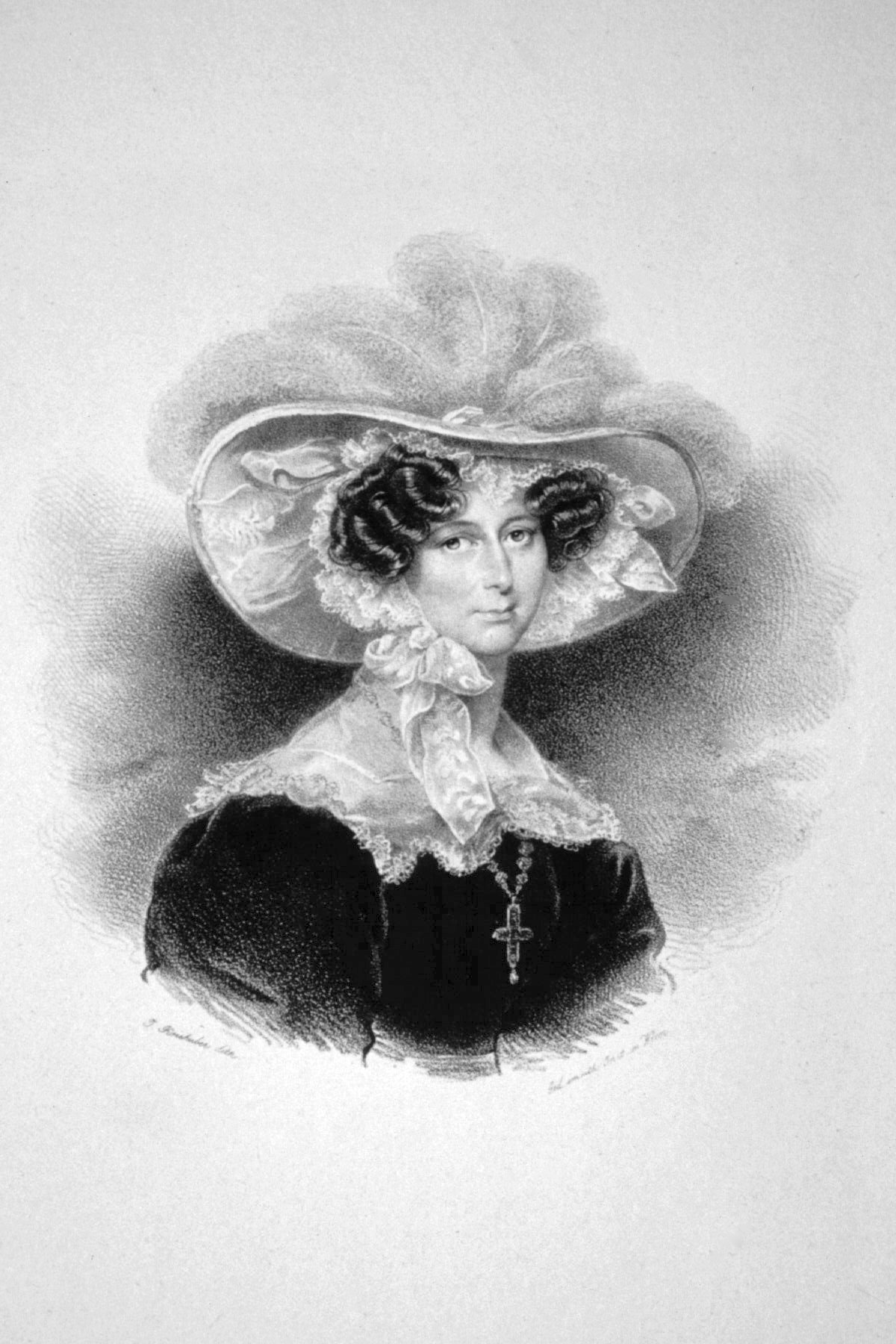
Lithograph of his wife, Countess Guidobaldine Cavriani, by Josef Kriehuber, c. 1830

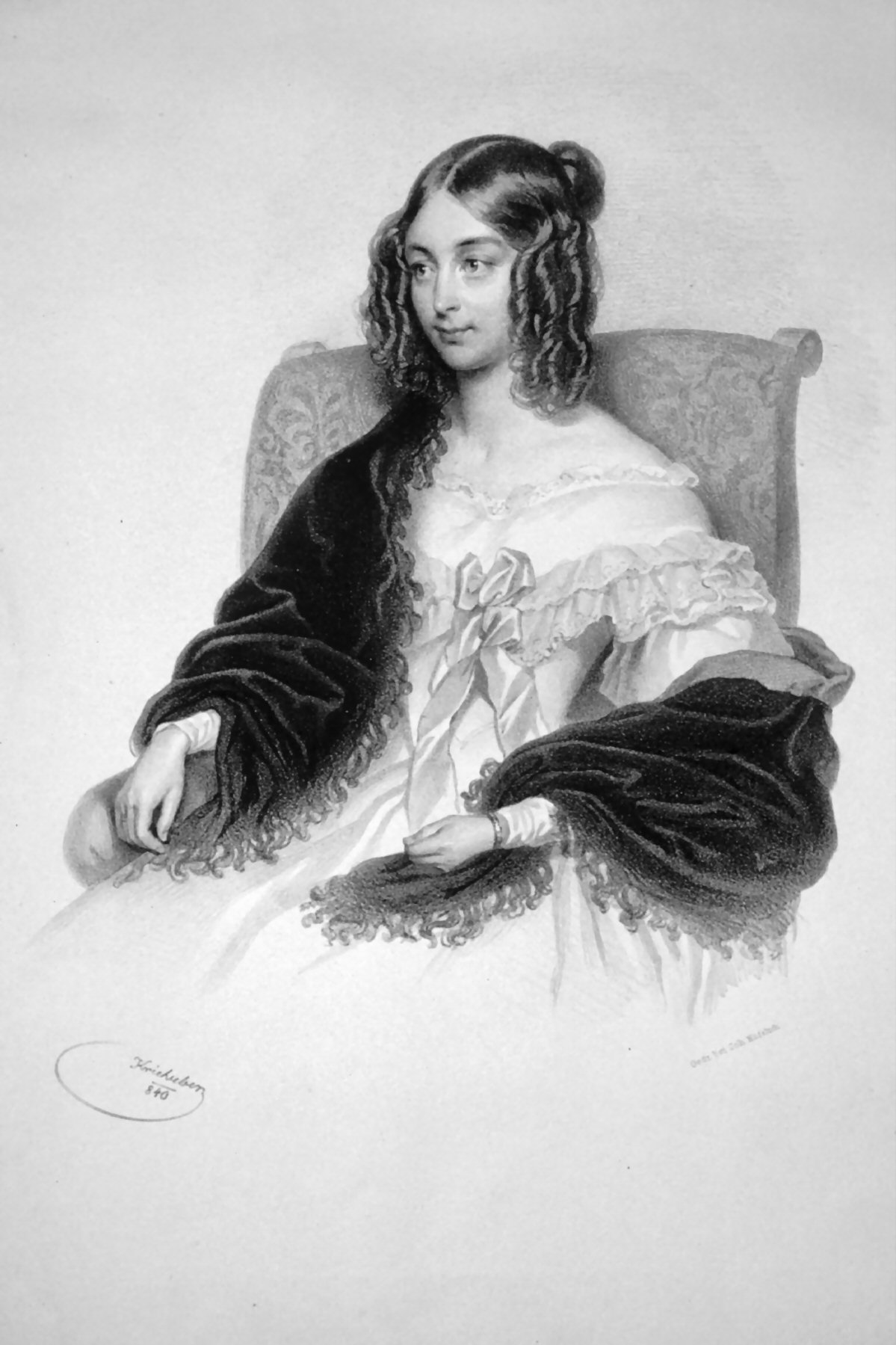
Lithograph of his daughter, Countess Guidobaldine von Kuefstein, by Josef Kriehuber, 1840

On 4 February 1805, Paar was married to Countess Guidobaldine Cavriani (1783–1861), the daughter of Count Ludwig Franz Cavriani and Johanna Terezie of Kolowrat-Novohradský (a daughter of Count František Ferdinand of Kolowrat-Novohradský). Together, they were the parents of:

- Karl Wenzel Ludwig von Paar, 4th Prince Paar (1806–1881), who married Princess Ida Leopoldine Sophie Marie Josephine Franziska of Liechtenstein, youngest daughter of Johann I Joseph, Prince of Liechtenstein and Landgravine Josepha of Fürstenberg-Weitra, in 1832.
- Count Alfred Wenzel Ludwig David von Paar (1806–1885), a Chamberlain, Privy Councillor and Lieutenant Field Marshal.
- Countess Guidobaldine Theresia Francisca Bibiana Johanna von Paar (1807–1874), who married Count Franz Seraphin von Kuefstein, Privy Councillor, Chamberlain and Chief Court Master, in 1830.
- Count Wenzel Anton Ludwig Caspar Melchior Balthasar von Paar (1810–1890), a Major in the Austrian Army.
- Countess Johanna von Paar (1811–1812), who died young.
- Countess Antonia Maria Eusebia Johanna Rosalia von Paar (1814–1818), who died young.
- Count Ludwig Johann Baptist Emmanuel von Paar (1817–1893), who married Countess Maria Anna Esterházy von Galántha, a daughter of Kázmér Miklós Esterházy von Galántha and his wife, Countess Leopoldina Szapáry de Muraszombath (a daughter of Count József Szápáry de Muraszombath) in 1858.

Paar died on 30 December 1819 in Vienna and was succeeded by his eldest son, Karl. He was buried at Bechyně in southern Bohemia (today the Czech Republic).
