= List of ambassadors of Austria to Sweden =

Ambassadors of Austria to Italy

Ambassador of the Republic of Austria to the Kingdom of Sweden
- Coat of arms of Austria
- Incumbent; Gudrun Graf since 2018
- Ministry of Foreign Affairs; Embassy of Austria
- Style: His Excellency
- Website: Austrian Embassy, Stockholm

The Ambassador of the Republic of Austria to the Kingdom of Sweden is the Republic of Austria's (formerly the Holy Roman Empire, the Austrian Empire and the Austro-Hungarian Empire) foremost diplomatic representative in Sweden. As head of Austria's diplomatic mission there, the ambassador is the official representative of the president and government of Austria to the King and the government of Sweden. The position has the rank and status of an Ambassador Extraordinary and Minister Plenipotentiary and the embassy is located in Stockholm.

== Heads of Mission ==
=== Habsburg ambassadors (until 1804) ===
- 1654–1655 Georg von Plettenberg
- 1673–1674 Adolph Wratislaw von Sternberg

1682: Establishment of diplomatic relations

- 1682–1683: Michael Wenzel von Althann
- 1684–1690: Count Anton Johann von Nostitz
- 1690–1699: Franz Ottokar von Starhemberg
- 1702–1705: Count Ludwig von Zinzendorf
- 1706–1707: Count Ludwig von Zinzendorf
  …
- 1719–1728: Burkhard von Frydag
- 1728–1734: Christoph Theodor Antivari (Charge d'Affaires)
- 1734–1737: Ferdinand Leopold von Herberstein
- 1737–1750: Christoph Theodor Antivari (Charge d'Affaires)
- 1750–1761: Siegmund von Goëß
- 1761–1763: Christoph Theodor Antivari (Charge d'Affaires)
- 1763–1764: Theodor von Christiani (Charge d'Affaires)
- 1764–1769: Ludwig Karl von Barbiano-Belgiojoso
- 1769–1771: Benedikt de Caché (Charge d'Affaires)
- 1771–1774: Anton von Widmann
- 1774–1775: Josef von Preindl (Charge d'Affaires)
- 1775–1777: Josef von Kaunitz-Rietberg
- 1777–1778: Josef von Preindl (Charge d'Affaires)
- 1778–1779: Johann Friedrich von Kageneck
- 1779–1785: Josef von Preindl (Charge d'Affaires)
- 1785–1787: Johann von Mercier (Charge d'Affaires)
- 1787–1789: Johann Philipp von Stadion
- 1789–1795: Carl Wilhelm von Ludolf
- 1795–1799: Franz von Swieteczky (Charge d'Affaires)
- 1799–1804: Franz von Lodron-Laterano

=== Imperial and Royal Austrian Ambassador (until 1868) ===
- 1805–1811: Karl Binder von Krieglstein (Charge d'Affaires)
- 1811–1813: Adam Albert von Neipperg
- 1813–1815: Franz von Weiss (Charge d'Affaires)
- 1815–1820: Adam von Ficquelmont
- 1820–1844: Eduard von Woyna (Charge d'Affaires until 1829)
- 1844–1847: Valentin Esterházy
- 1847–1849: Friedrich von Thun und Hohenstein
- 1849–1850: Emmerich Széchényi (Charge d'Affaires)
- 1850–1851: Albert von Crivelli (Charge d'Affaires)
- 1851–1859: Ferdinand von Langenau (Charge d'Affaires)
- 1859–1863: Ludwig von Paar
- 1863–1868: Ladislaus von Karnicki (Charge d'Affaires)

=== Imperial and Royal Austro-Hungarian Ambassador (until 1918) ===
- 1868–1872: Rudolf von Mülinen
- 1872–1874: Otto von Walterskirchen
- 1874–1879: Nikolaus von Pottenburg
- 1879–1894: Karl von Pfusterschmid-Hardtenstein
- 1894–1902: Josef Wodzicki von Granow
- 1902–1905: Otto zu Brandis
- 1905–1909: Albert Eperjesy von Szászváros und Tóti
- 1909–1912: Konstantin Dumba
- 1912–1918: Maximilian Hadik von Futak

=== Minister of the Republic of Austria (1924–1956) ===
- 1924–1933: Carl Buchberger
- 1933–1938: Heinrich Sommaruga
- ~~1938–1947~~: Interruption of relations
- 1947–1951: Paul Winterstein
- 1951–1955: Karl Zeileissen

=== Ambassador of the Republic of Austria (since 1956) ===
- 1956–1965: Rudolf Krippl-Redlich-Redensbruck
- 1965–1967: Alois Marquet
- 1968–1969: Ernst Luegmayer
- 1970–1974: Karl Herbert Schober
- 1974–1979: Karl Fischer
- 1980–1985: Ferdinand Stolberg
- 1986–1989: Ingo Mussi
- 1990–1992: Otto Pleinert – from 1991 also Ambassador to Latvia
- 1993–1997: Franz Parak – also Ambassador to Latvia
- 1998–2002: Nikolaus Scherk
- 2002–2005: Peter Pramberger
- 2005–2010: Stephan Toth
- 2010–2013: Ulrike Tilly
- 2013–2018: Arthur Winkler-Hermaden
- 2018–Present: Gudrun Graf

== See also ==
- Foreign relations of Austria
- Foreign relations of Sweden
