= Kielmansegg =

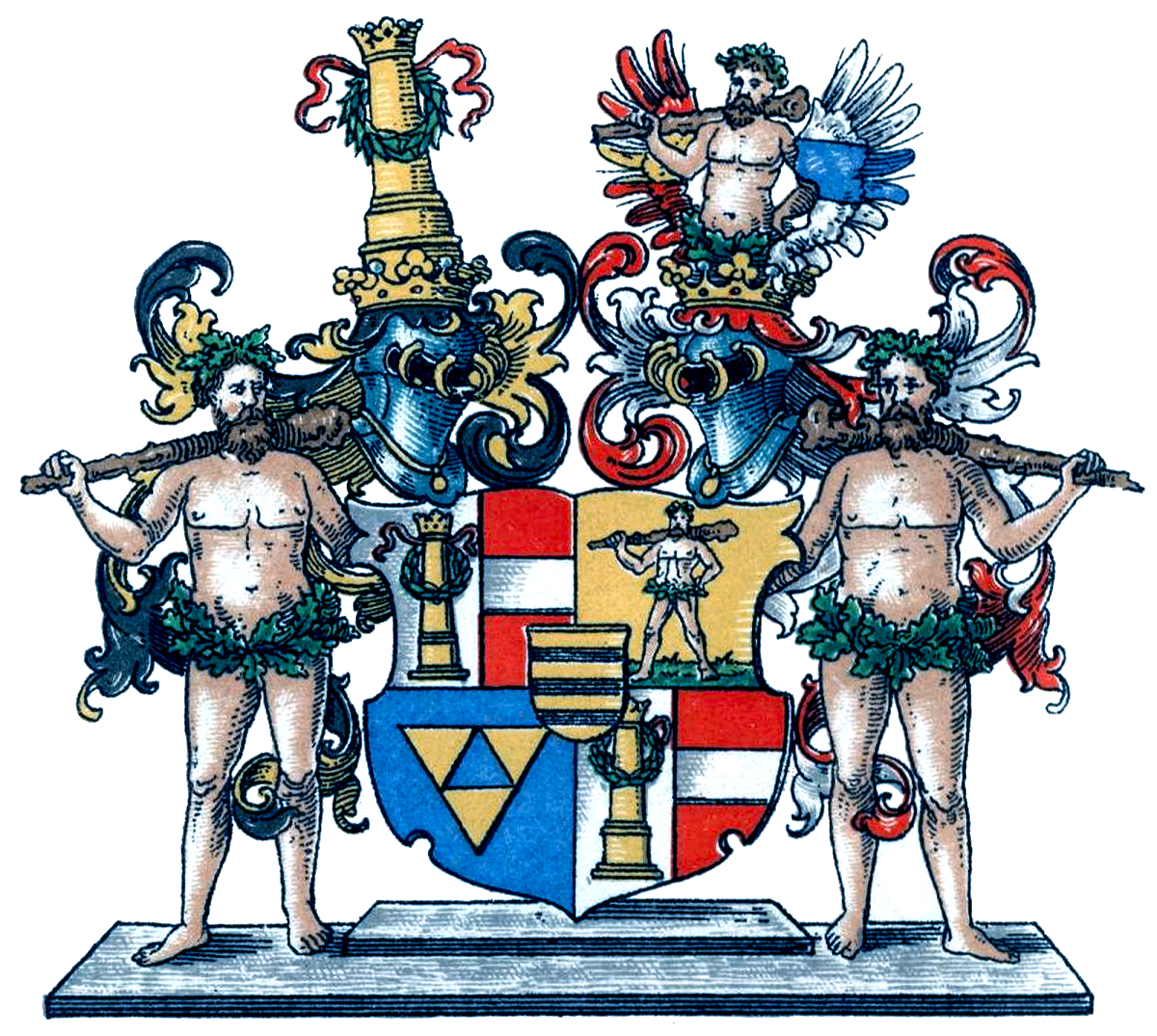
Coat of Arms of the Counts of Kielmansegg

The Kielmansegg family is an old German noble family. Members of the family held the title of Imperial Count, granted to them on 23 February 1723 by Charles VI, Holy Roman Emperor.

== Notable members ==
- Oswald von Kielmansegg (1838–1896), Austrian Lieutenant Field Marshal in the Austro-Hungarian service.
- Count Erich Kielmansegg (1847–1923), Austrian statesman
- Friedrich von Kielmansegg (1768–1851), German officer
- Johann von Kielmansegg (1906–2006), German general staff officer
- Sophia von Kielmansegg, Countess of Darlington (1675–1725), German-born courtier

== See also ==
- Auguste Charlotte von Kielmannsegge (1777–1863), Saxon noblewoman and Napoleon's secret agent
