= Stein, Styria =

Stein
- Former municipality
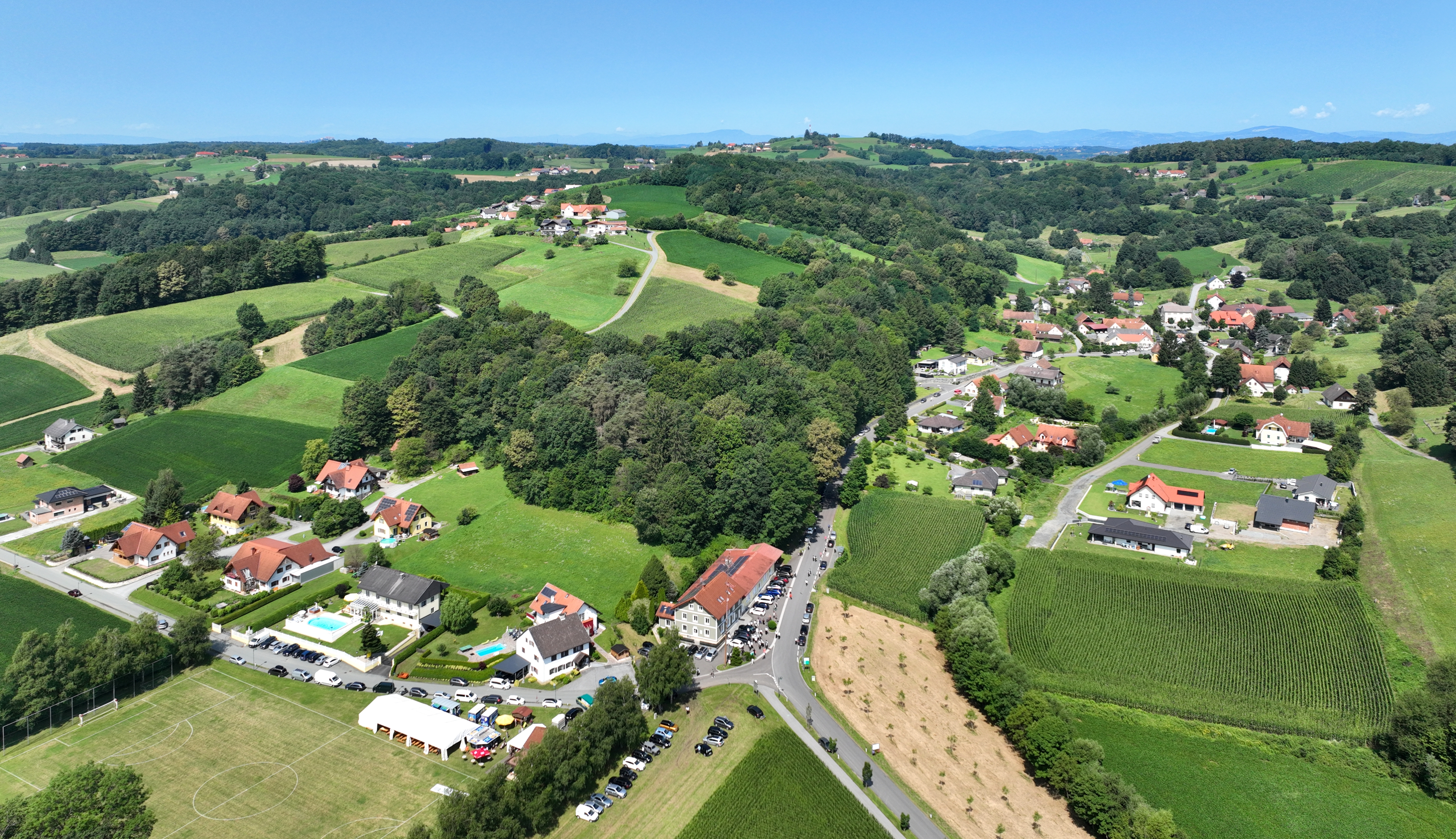
- Aerial view of Stein

- Coat of arms

- Location within Austria
- Coordinates: 46°59′58″N 16°05′04″E
- Country: Austria
- State: Styria
- District: Hartberg-Fürstenfeld

Area
  - Total: 7.33 km^{2} (2.83 sq mi)
- Elevation: 320–360 m (1,050–1,180 ft)

Population (1 January 2016)
  - Total: 495
  - Density: 67.5/km^{2} (175/sq mi)
- Time zone: UTC+1 (CET)
  - Summer (DST): UTC+2 (CEST)
- Postal code: 8282
- Area code: 03382
- Vehicle registration: FF
- Website: www.stein.steiermark.at

Stein (German pronunciation: [ʃtaɪn]) is a former municipality in the district of Hartberg-Fürstenfeld in Styria, Austria. Since the 2015 Styria municipal structural reform, it is part of the municipality Loipersdorf bei Fürstenfeld.
