= Zdechovice (Hradec Králové District) =

- Municipality
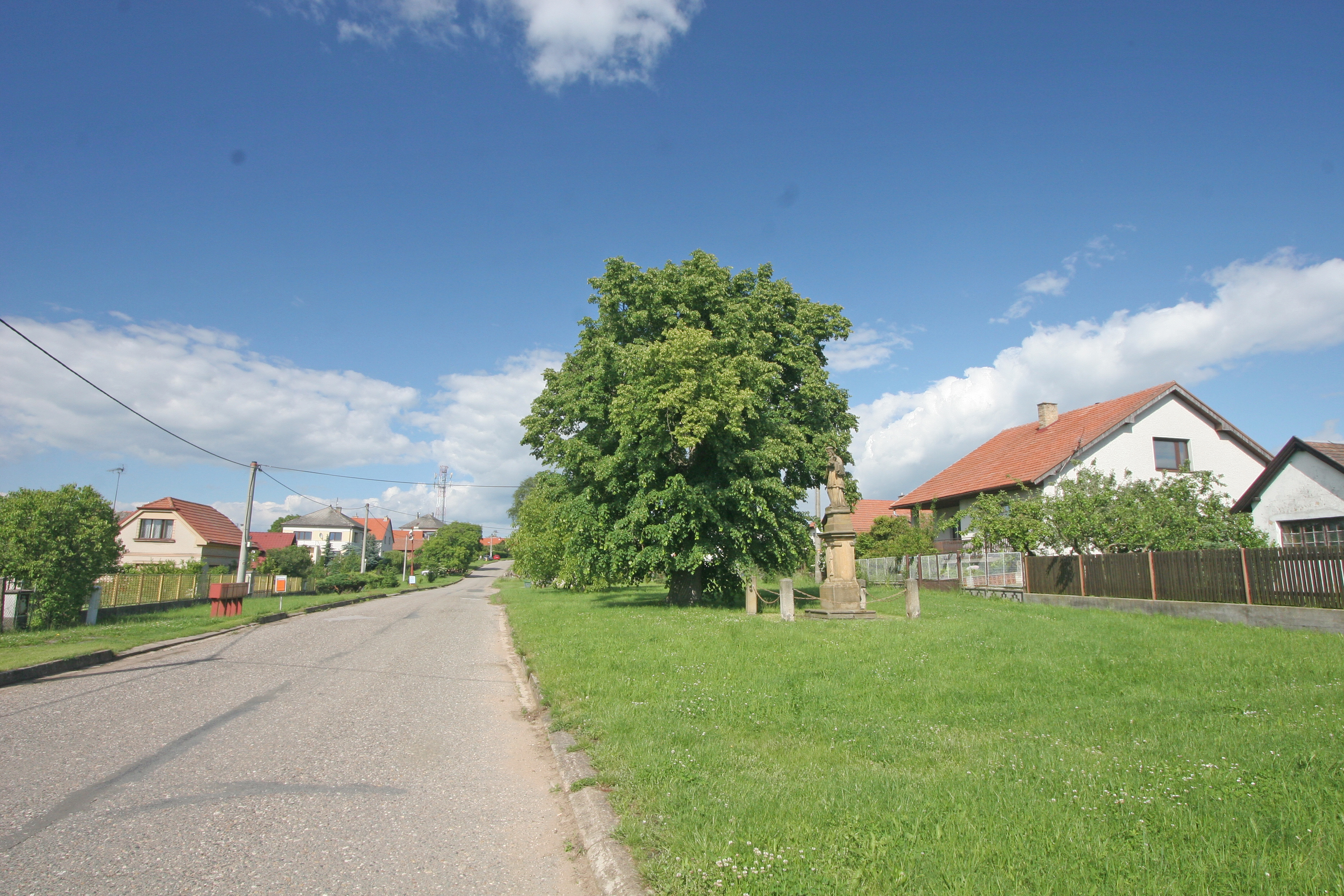
- Centre of Zdechovice

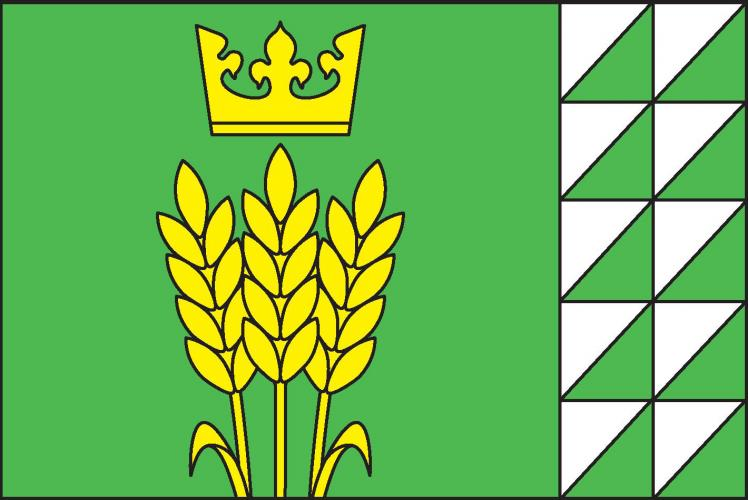
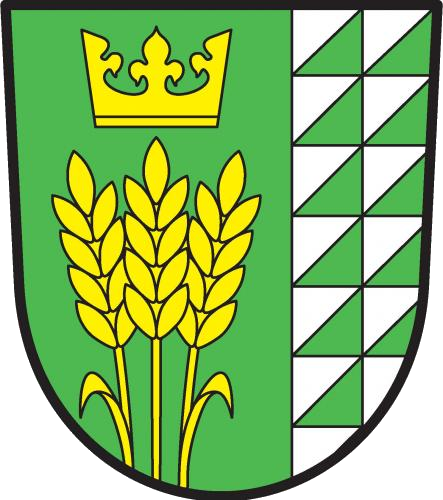
- Flag Coat of arms

- Location in the Czech Republic
- Coordinates: 50°13′29″N 15°33′42″E
- Country: Czech Republic
- Region: Hradec Králové
- District: Hradec Králové
- First mentioned: 1311

Area
  - Total: 5.43 km^{2} (2.10 sq mi)
- Elevation: 280 m (920 ft)

Population (2026-01-01)
  - Total: 164
  - Density: 30.2/km^{2} (78.2/sq mi)
- Time zone: UTC+1 (CET)
  - Summer (DST): UTC+2 (CEST)
- Postal code: 504 01
- Website: www.obec-zdechovice.cz

Zdechovice is a municipality and village in Hradec Králové District in the Hradec Králové Region of the Czech Republic. It has about 200 inhabitants.

== Demographics ==
Historical population
Year	Pop.	±%
1869	296	—
1880	345	+16.6%
1890	337	−2.3%
1900	323	−4.2%
1910	280	−13.3%
1921	335	+19.6%
1930	304	−9.3%
1950	211	−30.6%
1961	225	+6.6%
1970	190	−15.6%
1980	143	−24.7%
1991	155	+8.4%
2001	142	−8.4%
2011	164	+15.5%
2021	157	−4.3%
Source: Censuses
