= Zdechovice (Pardubice District) =

- Municipality
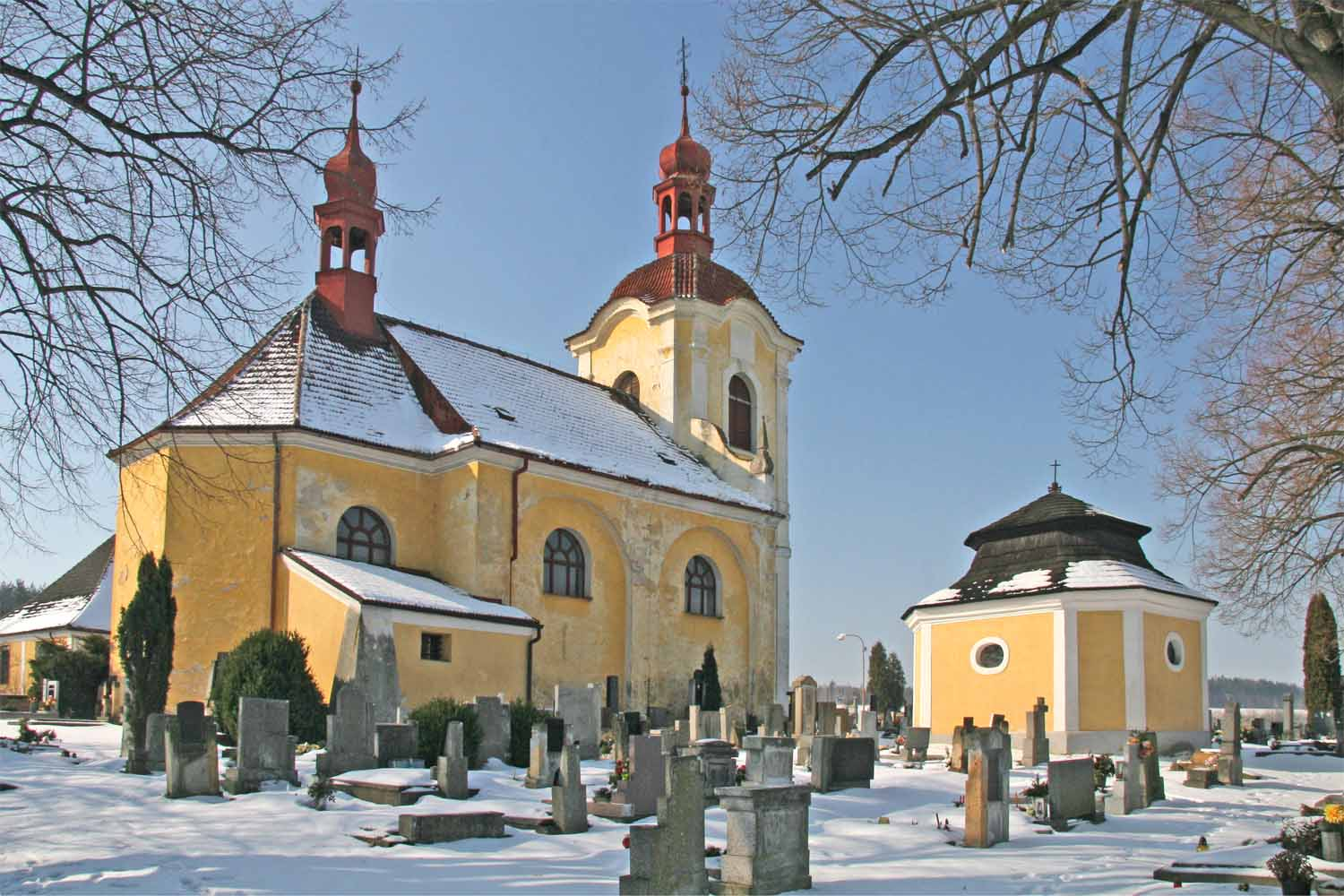
- Church of Saints Peter and Paul

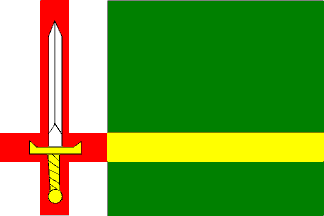
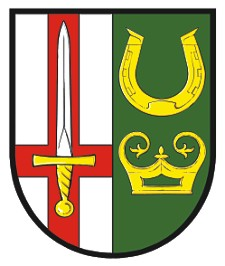
- Flag Coat of arms

- Location in the Czech Republic
- Coordinates: 50°0′47″N 15°28′10″E
- Country: Czech Republic
- Region: Pardubice
- District: Pardubice
- First mentioned: 1352

Area
  - Total: 8.62 km^{2} (3.33 sq mi)
- Elevation: 228 m (748 ft)

Population (2026-01-01)
  - Total: 686
  - Density: 79.6/km^{2} (206/sq mi)
- Time zone: UTC+1 (CET)
  - Summer (DST): UTC+2 (CEST)
- Postal code: 533 11
- Website: www.zdechovice.cz

Zdechovice is a municipality and village in Pardubice District in the Pardubice Region of the Czech Republic. It has about 700 inhabitants.

== Administrative division ==
Zdechovice consists of three municipal parts (in brackets population according to the 2021 census):

- Zdechovice (146)
- Spytovice (133)
- Zbraněves (0)

== Demographics ==
Historical population
Year	Pop.	±%
1869	994	—
1880	1,018	+2.4%
1890	1,005	−1.3%
1900	964	−4.1%
1910	958	−0.6%
1921	877	−8.5%
1930	797	−9.1%
1950	647	−18.8%
1961	716	+10.7%
1970	618	−13.7%
1980	565	−8.6%
1991	514	−9.0%
2001	620	+20.6%
2011	604	−2.6%
2021	609	+0.8%
Source: Censuses
