= Zesterfleth family =

German noble family

Zesterfleth
- Noble family of baronial rank
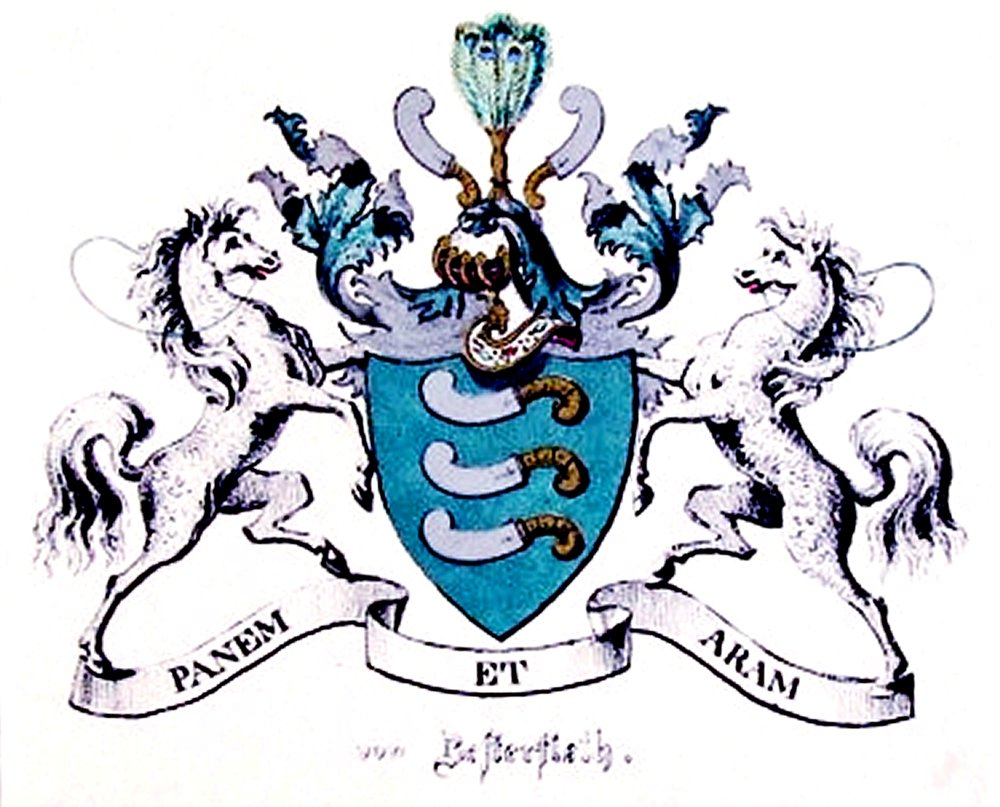
- Coat of arms escutcheon depicts three leftwards facing, horizontally aligned silver knives with golden handles
- Country: Germany
- Place of origin: Lower Saxony
- Titles: Junker, Freiherr, Baron
- Motto: "Panem et Aram"

The Zesterfleth family is an ancient Northern German noble family with origins traceable to the early 14th century ministerial and lord Marquardt of Tzestersflete.

Notable descendants include John (Johann, Johannes) II Gryse of Zesterfleth, then dean of the Bremian chapter, later bishop of Verden from 1381 until his death in 1388, who precipitated a local uproar by publicly accusing Albert (Albrecht) II of Brunswick-Wolffenbüttel of being "man and woman simultaneously", likely alleging hermaphroditism.

Diedrich von Zesterfleth, a descendant of the Hanoverian Zesterfleths, was granted the French Baron title by Jérôme Bonaparte, King of Westphalia in 1813. Gregor von Zesterfleth of a Prussian family branch was created a Freiherr in Bavaria in the year 1833.

== Name and history ==
Its surname derives from a no longer existent hamlet near Jork, Lower Saxony likely destroyed and washed away in a storm surge estimated to have occurred around the year 1412 ("Cäcilienflut").

Many hardly identifiable spelling variants of the family name appear in literature, complicating definite historical research. Branches of the family emigrated to France, England, the Netherlands and Scandinavia starting from the 18th century.
