= Palazzo Cavriani, Mantua =

Palace in Mantua, Italy

Coordinates: 45.1635°N 10.7914°E

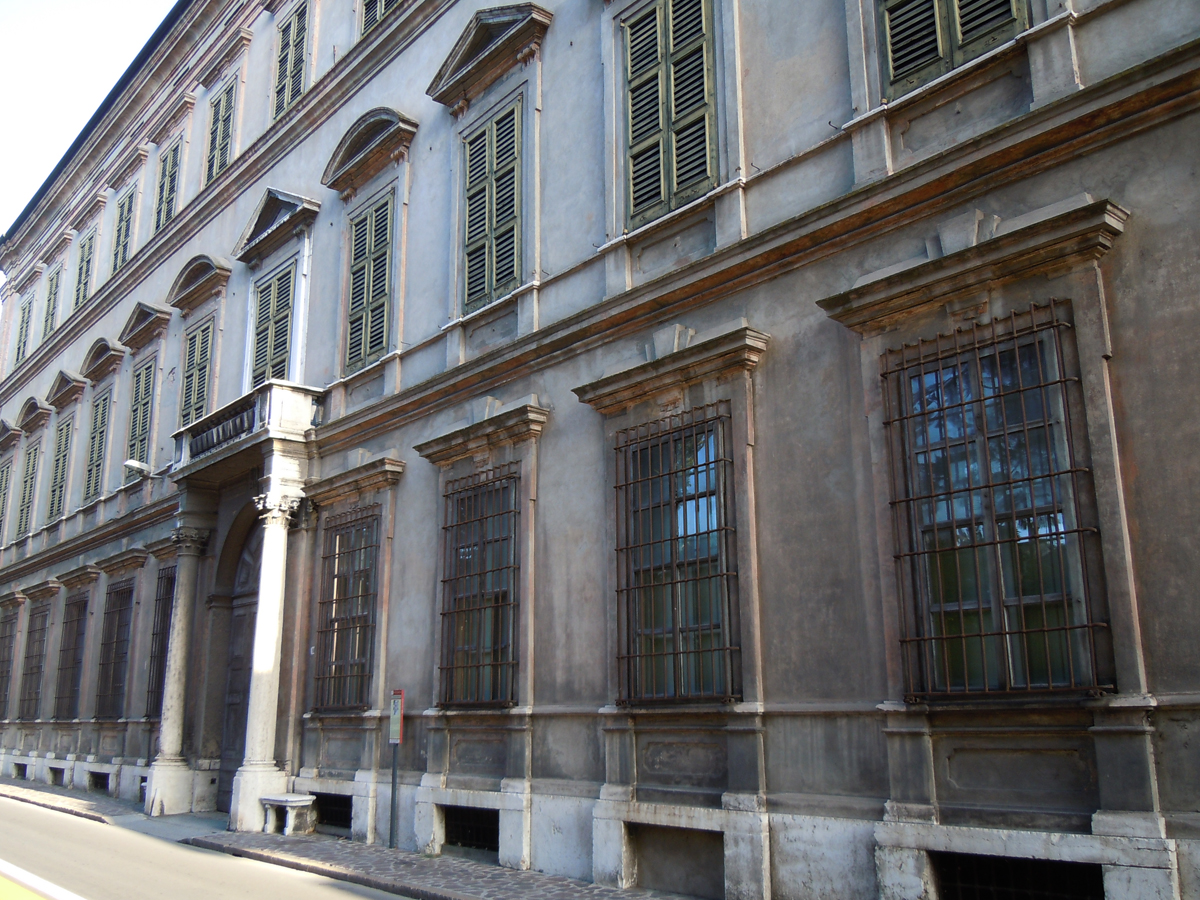
Facade of Palazzo Cavriani, Mantua

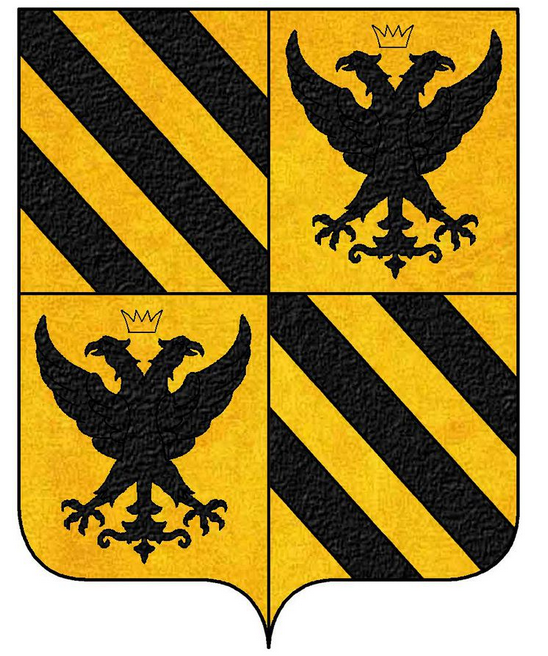
Coat of Arms of the Cavriani family

Palazzo Cavriani is an aristocratic palace with gardens located in Mantua, Italy. The palace is also sometimes referred to as the Palazzo Gonzaga-Spolverini, but the palace belonging to those families was either razed or subsumed into the present neoclassical structure and garden.

== History ==
By the 1550s, the site had a palace with a large courtyard and garden, belonging to Giovanni Ludovico Gonzaga of the de’ Nobili family, of the Schivenoglia line, who died in 1546. In the 18th-century, the palace was inherited by Anna Maria Gonzaga, wife of Giacomo Spolverini. Her heirs sold the palace to the Cavriani family, who rebuilt the palazzo in 1756, based on designs by the architect Alfonso Torreggiani. In 1824–1826, the garden at the rear of the palace was built. The fence surrounding the garden has outward facing bust of famous Mantuans, with a statue of Virgil (1835) and Giuseppe Fontana in the center. The garden utilized the sculptor Stefano Gerola; Chiozzini and Silva for the wrought iron and the Mantuan painter Alessandro Ferraresi for the creation of the perspectives painted on the far walls. In September 1838, on the occasion of a visit to Mantua by Emperor Ferdinand I, the Marquis organised an extravagant system of lights for his garden, and the property was connected by an underground passageway designed by the Venetian Giuseppe Jappelli to link it to the gardens at the Palazzo di Schivenoglia or dell’Abate.

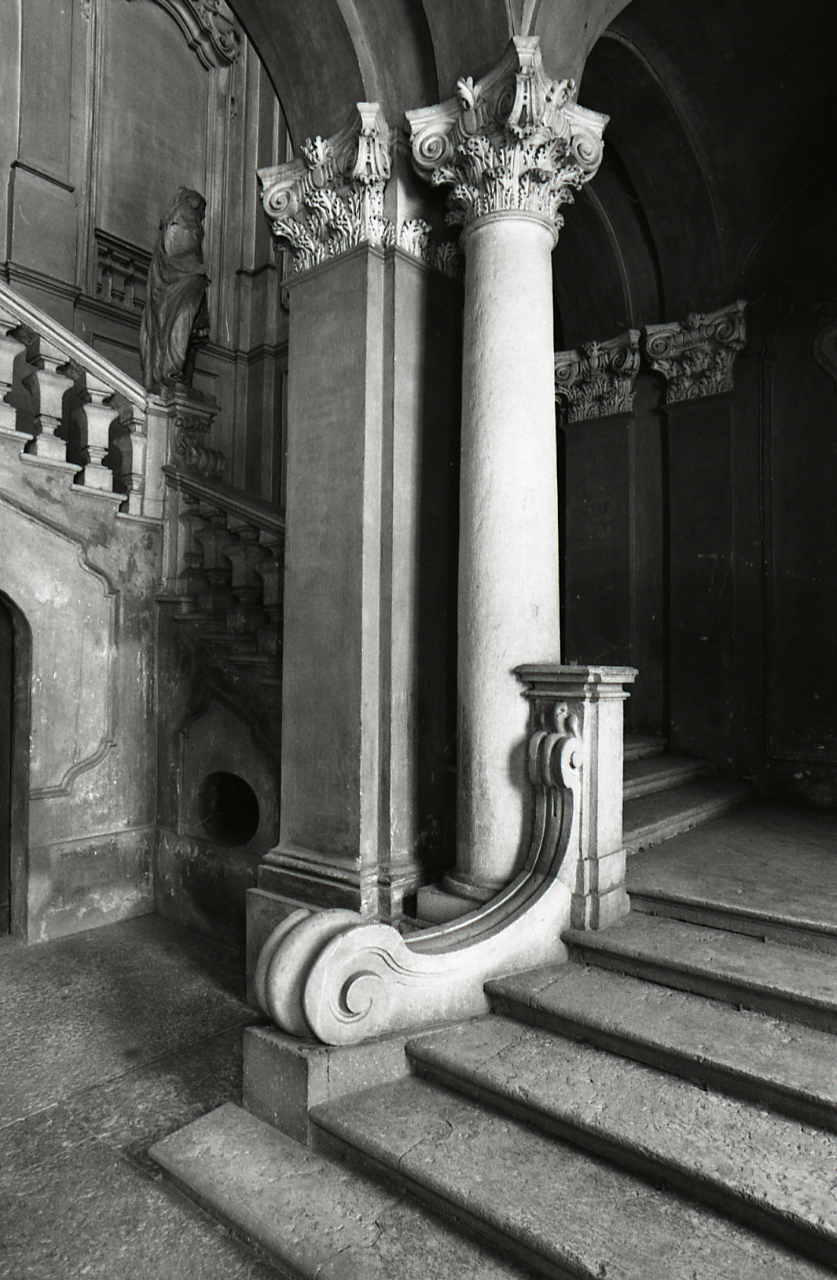
Staircase. Photo by Paolo Monti

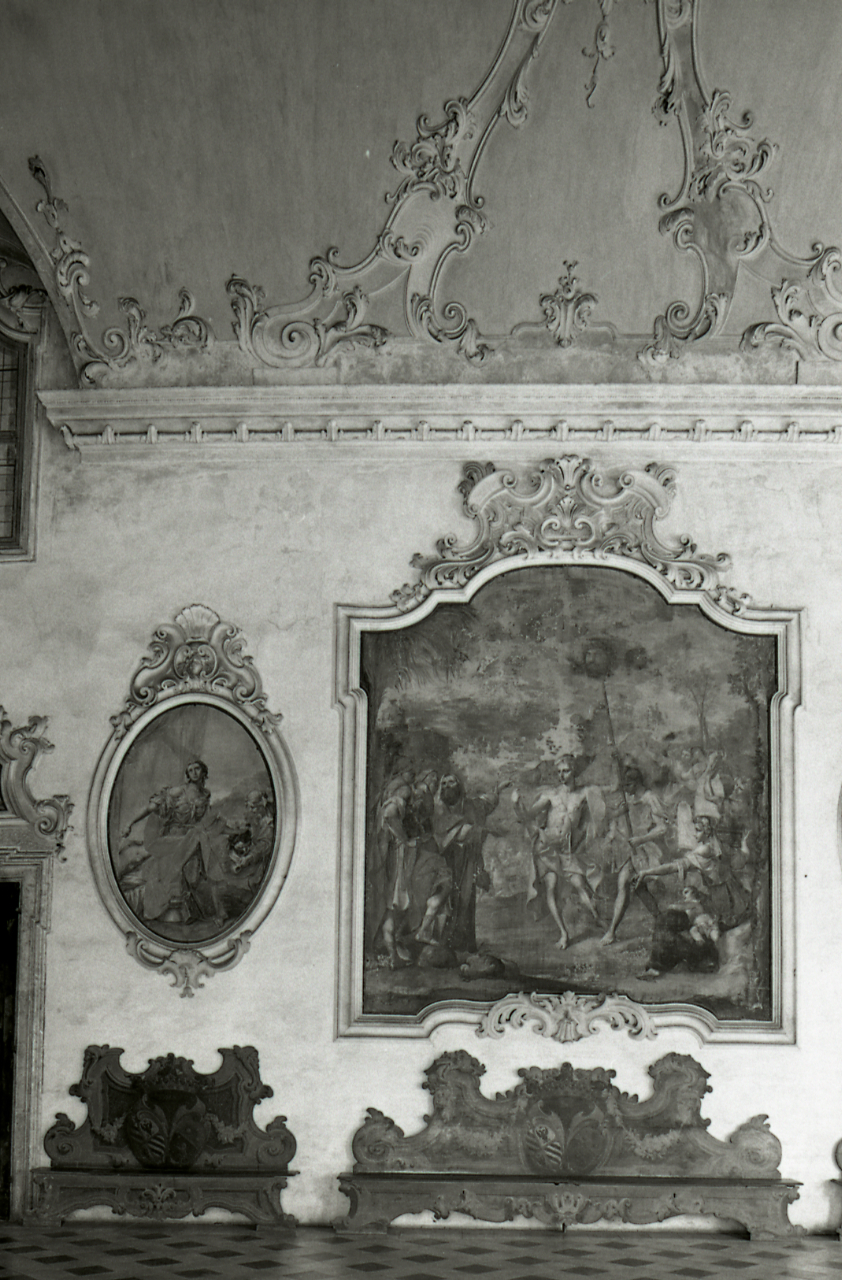
Hall, detail. Photo by Paolo Monti
